

15001–15100 

|-bgcolor=#d6d6d6
| 15001 Fuzhou ||  ||  || November 21, 1997 || Xinglong || SCAP || — || align=right | 7.6 km || 
|-id=002 bgcolor=#d6d6d6
| 15002 ||  || — || November 29, 1997 || Socorro || LINEAR || THM || align=right | 7.7 km || 
|-id=003 bgcolor=#d6d6d6
| 15003 Midori ||  ||  || December 5, 1997 || Oizumi || T. Kobayashi || EOS || align=right | 9.7 km || 
|-id=004 bgcolor=#d6d6d6
| 15004 Vallerani ||  ||  || December 7, 1997 || Asiago || M. Tombelli, G. Forti || EOS || align=right | 9.6 km || 
|-id=005 bgcolor=#d6d6d6
| 15005 Guerriero ||  ||  || December 7, 1997 || Cima Ekar || M. Tombelli, U. Munari || HYG || align=right | 8.5 km || 
|-id=006 bgcolor=#d6d6d6
| 15006 Samcristoforetti ||  ||  || February 27, 1998 || Cima Ekar || G. Forti, M. Tombelli || — || align=right | 5.3 km || 
|-id=007 bgcolor=#E9E9E9
| 15007 Edoardopozio || 1998 NA ||  || July 5, 1998 || Colleverde || V. S. Casulli || — || align=right | 5.6 km || 
|-id=008 bgcolor=#E9E9E9
| 15008 Delahodde ||  ||  || August 24, 1998 || Caussols || ODAS || — || align=right | 2.7 km || 
|-id=009 bgcolor=#fefefe
| 15009 ||  || — || August 24, 1998 || Socorro || LINEAR || H || align=right | 1.3 km || 
|-id=010 bgcolor=#fefefe
| 15010 ||  || — || August 28, 1998 || Socorro || LINEAR || NYS || align=right | 4.6 km || 
|-id=011 bgcolor=#E9E9E9
| 15011 ||  || — || August 28, 1998 || Socorro || LINEAR || — || align=right | 3.9 km || 
|-id=012 bgcolor=#fefefe
| 15012 ||  || — || August 28, 1998 || Socorro || LINEAR || FLO || align=right | 4.3 km || 
|-id=013 bgcolor=#E9E9E9
| 15013 ||  || — || August 28, 1998 || Socorro || LINEAR || — || align=right | 11 km || 
|-id=014 bgcolor=#fefefe
| 15014 Annagekker ||  ||  || September 14, 1998 || Socorro || LINEAR || — || align=right | 4.9 km || 
|-id=015 bgcolor=#E9E9E9
| 15015 ||  || — || September 14, 1998 || Socorro || LINEAR || EUN || align=right | 3.9 km || 
|-id=016 bgcolor=#fefefe
| 15016 ||  || — || September 16, 1998 || Caussols || ODAS || MAS || align=right | 2.8 km || 
|-id=017 bgcolor=#fefefe
| 15017 Cuppy ||  ||  || September 22, 1998 || Anderson Mesa || LONEOS || FLO || align=right | 1.8 km || 
|-id=018 bgcolor=#fefefe
| 15018 ||  || — || September 26, 1998 || Socorro || LINEAR || — || align=right | 6.8 km || 
|-id=019 bgcolor=#fefefe
| 15019 Gingold ||  ||  || September 29, 1998 || Socorro || LINEAR || — || align=right | 2.2 km || 
|-id=020 bgcolor=#fefefe
| 15020 Brandonimber ||  ||  || September 26, 1998 || Socorro || LINEAR || MAS || align=right | 3.1 km || 
|-id=021 bgcolor=#fefefe
| 15021 Alexkardon ||  ||  || September 26, 1998 || Socorro || LINEAR || NYS || align=right | 2.4 km || 
|-id=022 bgcolor=#fefefe
| 15022 ||  || — || September 20, 1998 || La Silla || E. W. Elst || — || align=right | 2.3 km || 
|-id=023 bgcolor=#fefefe
| 15023 Ketover ||  ||  || September 26, 1998 || Socorro || LINEAR || NYS || align=right | 2.4 km || 
|-id=024 bgcolor=#fefefe
| 15024 || 1998 TB || — || October 2, 1998 || Gekko || T. Kagawa || — || align=right | 4.6 km || 
|-id=025 bgcolor=#d6d6d6
| 15025 Uwontario ||  ||  || October 15, 1998 || Kitt Peak || Spacewatch || — || align=right | 9.5 km || 
|-id=026 bgcolor=#E9E9E9
| 15026 Davidscott ||  ||  || October 14, 1998 || Anderson Mesa || LONEOS || — || align=right | 5.2 km || 
|-id=027 bgcolor=#fefefe
| 15027 ||  || — || October 23, 1998 || Višnjan Observatory || K. Korlević || FLO || align=right | 4.4 km || 
|-id=028 bgcolor=#fefefe
| 15028 Soushiyou ||  ||  || October 26, 1998 || Nanyo || T. Okuni || NYS || align=right | 5.2 km || 
|-id=029 bgcolor=#fefefe
| 15029 ||  || — || November 11, 1998 || Višnjan Observatory || K. Korlević || — || align=right | 2.9 km || 
|-id=030 bgcolor=#E9E9E9
| 15030 Matthewkroll ||  ||  || November 10, 1998 || Socorro || LINEAR || — || align=right | 6.7 km || 
|-id=031 bgcolor=#fefefe
| 15031 Lemus ||  ||  || November 10, 1998 || Socorro || LINEAR || — || align=right | 3.2 km || 
|-id=032 bgcolor=#fefefe
| 15032 Alexlevin ||  ||  || November 10, 1998 || Socorro || LINEAR || V || align=right | 3.6 km || 
|-id=033 bgcolor=#C2FFFF
| 15033 ||  || — || November 10, 1998 || Socorro || LINEAR || L4 || align=right | 33 km || 
|-id=034 bgcolor=#fefefe
| 15034 Décines || 1998 WH ||  || November 16, 1998 || San Marcello || M. Tombelli, L. Tesi || — || align=right | 5.1 km || 
|-id=035 bgcolor=#fefefe
| 15035 ||  || — || November 18, 1998 || Kushiro || S. Ueda, H. Kaneda || FLO || align=right | 4.0 km || 
|-id=036 bgcolor=#fefefe
| 15036 Giovannianselmi ||  ||  || November 18, 1998 || Dossobuono || Madonna di Dossobuono Obs. || V || align=right | 3.1 km || 
|-id=037 bgcolor=#d6d6d6
| 15037 Chassagne ||  ||  || November 22, 1998 || Village-Neuf || Village-Neuf Obs. || EOS || align=right | 8.4 km || 
|-id=038 bgcolor=#fefefe
| 15038 ||  || — || November 23, 1998 || Oizumi || T. Kobayashi || NYS || align=right | 3.2 km || 
|-id=039 bgcolor=#fefefe
| 15039 ||  || — || November 21, 1998 || Socorro || LINEAR || NYS || align=right | 3.9 km || 
|-id=040 bgcolor=#fefefe
| 15040 || 1998 XC || — || December 1, 1998 || Xinglong || SCAP || — || align=right | 5.0 km || 
|-id=041 bgcolor=#fefefe
| 15041 Paperetti ||  ||  || December 8, 1998 || San Marcello || L. Tesi, A. Boattini || — || align=right | 2.5 km || 
|-id=042 bgcolor=#d6d6d6
| 15042 Anndavgui ||  ||  || December 14, 1998 || Le Creusot || J.-C. Merlin || — || align=right | 5.1 km || 
|-id=043 bgcolor=#d6d6d6
| 15043 ||  || — || December 11, 1998 || Woomera || F. B. Zoltowski || KOR || align=right | 6.6 km || 
|-id=044 bgcolor=#d6d6d6
| 15044 ||  || — || December 15, 1998 || Višnjan Observatory || K. Korlević || — || align=right | 7.1 km || 
|-id=045 bgcolor=#E9E9E9
| 15045 Walesdymond ||  ||  || December 10, 1998 || Kitt Peak || Spacewatch || AST || align=right | 6.4 km || 
|-id=046 bgcolor=#fefefe
| 15046 ||  || — || December 14, 1998 || Socorro || LINEAR || NYS || align=right | 5.0 km || 
|-id=047 bgcolor=#fefefe
| 15047 ||  || — || December 14, 1998 || Socorro || LINEAR || — || align=right | 4.4 km || 
|-id=048 bgcolor=#fefefe
| 15048 ||  || — || December 14, 1998 || Socorro || LINEAR || — || align=right | 3.7 km || 
|-id=049 bgcolor=#E9E9E9
| 15049 ||  || — || December 15, 1998 || Socorro || LINEAR || EUN || align=right | 5.2 km || 
|-id=050 bgcolor=#d6d6d6
| 15050 Heddal ||  ||  || December 12, 1998 || Mérida || O. A. Naranjo || HYG || align=right | 13 km || 
|-id=051 bgcolor=#d6d6d6
| 15051 ||  || — || December 17, 1998 || Kleť || Kleť Obs. || — || align=right | 4.1 km || 
|-id=052 bgcolor=#d6d6d6
| 15052 Emileschweitzer ||  ||  || December 17, 1998 || Caussols || ODAS || HYG || align=right | 9.6 km || 
|-id=053 bgcolor=#fefefe
| 15053 Bochníček ||  ||  || December 17, 1998 || Ondřejov || P. Pravec, U. Babiaková || — || align=right | 3.2 km || 
|-id=054 bgcolor=#d6d6d6
| 15054 ||  || — || December 21, 1998 || Oizumi || T. Kobayashi || EOS || align=right | 9.6 km || 
|-id=055 bgcolor=#d6d6d6
| 15055 ||  || — || December 25, 1998 || Višnjan Observatory || K. Korlević, M. Jurić || — || align=right | 8.4 km || 
|-id=056 bgcolor=#d6d6d6
| 15056 Barbaradixon ||  ||  || December 28, 1998 || Jornada || D. S. Dixon || — || align=right | 15 km || 
|-id=057 bgcolor=#d6d6d6
| 15057 Whitson ||  ||  || December 22, 1998 || Kitt Peak || Spacewatch || THM || align=right | 7.7 km || 
|-id=058 bgcolor=#d6d6d6
| 15058 Billcooke ||  ||  || December 22, 1998 || Kitt Peak || Spacewatch || — || align=right | 9.3 km || 
|-id=059 bgcolor=#E9E9E9
| 15059 ||  || — || December 25, 1998 || Višnjan Observatory || K. Korlević || HEN || align=right | 5.9 km || 
|-id=060 bgcolor=#fefefe
| 15060 || 1999 AD || — || January 5, 1999 || Višnjan Observatory || K. Korlević || FLO || align=right | 3.2 km || 
|-id=061 bgcolor=#d6d6d6
| 15061 || 1999 AL || — || January 6, 1999 || Višnjan Observatory || K. Korlević || — || align=right | 12 km || 
|-id=062 bgcolor=#d6d6d6
| 15062 ||  || — || January 9, 1999 || Oizumi || T. Kobayashi || EOS || align=right | 7.6 km || 
|-id=063 bgcolor=#d6d6d6
| 15063 ||  || — || January 10, 1999 || Oizumi || T. Kobayashi || KOR || align=right | 5.3 km || 
|-id=064 bgcolor=#d6d6d6
| 15064 ||  || — || January 10, 1999 || High Point || D. K. Chesney || — || align=right | 9.1 km || 
|-id=065 bgcolor=#fefefe
| 15065 ||  || — || January 9, 1999 || Višnjan Observatory || K. Korlević || NYS || align=right | 2.3 km || 
|-id=066 bgcolor=#d6d6d6
| 15066 ||  || — || January 13, 1999 || Oizumi || T. Kobayashi || VER || align=right | 22 km || 
|-id=067 bgcolor=#E9E9E9
| 15067 ||  || — || January 10, 1999 || Xinglong || SCAP || GEF || align=right | 4.7 km || 
|-id=068 bgcolor=#d6d6d6
| 15068 Wiegert ||  ||  || January 13, 1999 || Kitt Peak || Spacewatch || SHU3:2 || align=right | 12 km || 
|-id=069 bgcolor=#d6d6d6
| 15069 ||  || — || January 15, 1999 || Višnjan Observatory || K. Korlević || — || align=right | 6.1 km || 
|-id=070 bgcolor=#fefefe
| 15070 ||  || — || January 20, 1999 || Nachi-Katsuura || Y. Shimizu, T. Urata || FLO || align=right | 3.7 km || 
|-id=071 bgcolor=#E9E9E9
| 15071 Hallerstein ||  ||  || January 24, 1999 || Črni Vrh || Črni Vrh || — || align=right | 6.9 km || 
|-id=072 bgcolor=#fefefe
| 15072 Landolt ||  ||  || January 25, 1999 || Baton Rouge || W. R. Cooney Jr., P. M. Motl || V || align=right | 2.0 km || 
|-id=073 bgcolor=#d6d6d6
| 15073 ||  || — || January 25, 1999 || Višnjan Observatory || K. Korlević || — || align=right | 15 km || 
|-id=074 bgcolor=#d6d6d6
| 15074 ||  || — || January 25, 1999 || High Point || D. K. Chesney || THM || align=right | 11 km || 
|-id=075 bgcolor=#fefefe
| 15075 ||  || — || January 24, 1999 || Višnjan Observatory || K. Korlević || NYS || align=right | 4.1 km || 
|-id=076 bgcolor=#fefefe
| 15076 Joellewis ||  ||  || January 18, 1999 || Socorro || LINEAR || V || align=right | 3.9 km || 
|-id=077 bgcolor=#d6d6d6
| 15077 Edyalge || 1999 CA ||  || February 2, 1999 || Gnosca || S. Sposetti || KOR || align=right | 7.3 km || 
|-id=078 bgcolor=#d6d6d6
| 15078 || 1999 CW || — || February 5, 1999 || Oizumi || T. Kobayashi || HYG || align=right | 8.8 km || 
|-id=079 bgcolor=#d6d6d6
| 15079 ||  || — || February 15, 1999 || Višnjan Observatory || K. Korlević || — || align=right | 5.1 km || 
|-id=080 bgcolor=#E9E9E9
| 15080 ||  || — || February 10, 1999 || Socorro || LINEAR || — || align=right | 6.9 km || 
|-id=081 bgcolor=#d6d6d6
| 15081 ||  || — || February 10, 1999 || Socorro || LINEAR || KOR || align=right | 6.7 km || 
|-id=082 bgcolor=#d6d6d6
| 15082 ||  || — || February 10, 1999 || Socorro || LINEAR || — || align=right | 18 km || 
|-id=083 bgcolor=#E9E9E9
| 15083 Tianhuili ||  ||  || February 10, 1999 || Socorro || LINEAR || — || align=right | 5.0 km || 
|-id=084 bgcolor=#d6d6d6
| 15084 ||  || — || February 10, 1999 || Socorro || LINEAR || — || align=right | 8.6 km || 
|-id=085 bgcolor=#d6d6d6
| 15085 ||  || — || February 10, 1999 || Socorro || LINEAR || THM || align=right | 14 km || 
|-id=086 bgcolor=#d6d6d6
| 15086 ||  || — || February 12, 1999 || Socorro || LINEAR || THM || align=right | 7.1 km || 
|-id=087 bgcolor=#d6d6d6
| 15087 ||  || — || February 12, 1999 || Socorro || LINEAR || — || align=right | 9.9 km || 
|-id=088 bgcolor=#fefefe
| 15088 Licitra ||  ||  || February 10, 1999 || Socorro || LINEAR || V || align=right | 2.2 km || 
|-id=089 bgcolor=#E9E9E9
| 15089 ||  || — || February 10, 1999 || Socorro || LINEAR || — || align=right | 6.4 km || 
|-id=090 bgcolor=#d6d6d6
| 15090 ||  || — || February 10, 1999 || Socorro || LINEAR || — || align=right | 6.7 km || 
|-id=091 bgcolor=#d6d6d6
| 15091 Howell ||  ||  || February 9, 1999 || Kitt Peak || Spacewatch || — || align=right | 8.8 km || 
|-id=092 bgcolor=#d6d6d6
| 15092 Beegees ||  ||  || March 15, 1999 || Reedy Creek || J. Broughton || EOS || align=right | 12 km || 
|-id=093 bgcolor=#fefefe
| 15093 Lestermackey ||  ||  || October 4, 1999 || Socorro || LINEAR || — || align=right | 3.1 km || 
|-id=094 bgcolor=#C2FFFF
| 15094 Polymele ||  ||  || November 17, 1999 || Catalina || CSS || L4 || align=right | 21 km || 
|-id=095 bgcolor=#fefefe
| 15095 ||  || — || November 28, 1999 || Oizumi || T. Kobayashi || — || align=right | 3.7 km || 
|-id=096 bgcolor=#E9E9E9
| 15096 ||  || — || December 5, 1999 || Socorro || LINEAR || — || align=right | 8.6 km || 
|-id=097 bgcolor=#d6d6d6
| 15097 ||  || — || December 8, 1999 || Socorro || LINEAR || — || align=right | 10 km || 
|-id=098 bgcolor=#fefefe
| 15098 ||  || — || January 1, 2000 || San Marcello || G. Forti, A. Boattini || NYS || align=right | 2.4 km || 
|-id=099 bgcolor=#E9E9E9
| 15099 Janestrohm ||  ||  || January 5, 2000 || Socorro || LINEAR || — || align=right | 4.7 km || 
|-id=100 bgcolor=#E9E9E9
| 15100 ||  || — || January 5, 2000 || Socorro || LINEAR || HNS || align=right | 6.0 km || 
|}

15101–15200 

|-bgcolor=#d6d6d6
| 15101 ||  || — || January 8, 2000 || Socorro || LINEAR || — || align=right | 14 km || 
|-id=102 bgcolor=#d6d6d6
| 15102 ||  || — || January 9, 2000 || Socorro || LINEAR || ALA || align=right | 23 km || 
|-id=103 bgcolor=#E9E9E9
| 15103 ||  || — || January 8, 2000 || Socorro || LINEAR || EUN || align=right | 4.8 km || 
|-id=104 bgcolor=#E9E9E9
| 15104 ||  || — || January 27, 2000 || Oizumi || T. Kobayashi || — || align=right | 16 km || 
|-id=105 bgcolor=#d6d6d6
| 15105 ||  || — || January 21, 2000 || Socorro || LINEAR || URS || align=right | 17 km || 
|-id=106 bgcolor=#E9E9E9
| 15106 Swanson ||  ||  || February 2, 2000 || Socorro || LINEAR || — || align=right | 5.0 km || 
|-id=107 bgcolor=#fefefe
| 15107 Toepperwein ||  ||  || February 2, 2000 || Socorro || LINEAR || FLOmoon || align=right | 2.9 km || 
|-id=108 bgcolor=#d6d6d6
| 15108 ||  || — || February 2, 2000 || Socorro || LINEAR || — || align=right | 14 km || 
|-id=109 bgcolor=#fefefe
| 15109 Wilber ||  ||  || February 2, 2000 || Socorro || LINEAR || V || align=right | 2.5 km || 
|-id=110 bgcolor=#d6d6d6
| 15110 ||  || — || February 2, 2000 || Socorro || LINEAR || EOS || align=right | 10 km || 
|-id=111 bgcolor=#fefefe
| 15111 Winters ||  ||  || February 6, 2000 || Socorro || LINEAR || — || align=right | 2.8 km || 
|-id=112 bgcolor=#fefefe
| 15112 Arlenewolfe ||  ||  || February 8, 2000 || Socorro || LINEAR || — || align=right | 7.1 km || 
|-id=113 bgcolor=#fefefe
| 15113 ||  || — || February 5, 2000 || Socorro || LINEAR || — || align=right | 5.0 km || 
|-id=114 bgcolor=#d6d6d6
| 15114 ||  || — || February 12, 2000 || Bergisch Gladbach || W. Bickel || — || align=right | 14 km || 
|-id=115 bgcolor=#fefefe
| 15115 Yvonneroe ||  ||  || February 29, 2000 || Oaxaca || J. M. Roe || MAS || align=right | 4.1 km || 
|-id=116 bgcolor=#fefefe
| 15116 Jaytate ||  ||  || February 27, 2000 || Kitt Peak || Spacewatch || EUT || align=right | 2.5 km || 
|-id=117 bgcolor=#d6d6d6
| 15117 ||  || — || February 29, 2000 || Socorro || LINEAR || — || align=right | 8.0 km || 
|-id=118 bgcolor=#fefefe
| 15118 Elizabethsears ||  ||  || February 28, 2000 || Socorro || LINEAR || — || align=right | 2.6 km || 
|-id=119 bgcolor=#d6d6d6
| 15119 ||  || — || February 29, 2000 || Socorro || LINEAR || URS || align=right | 11 km || 
|-id=120 bgcolor=#fefefe
| 15120 Mariafélix || 2000 ES ||  || March 4, 2000 || Marxuquera || J. J. Gomez || — || align=right | 2.5 km || 
|-id=121 bgcolor=#fefefe
| 15121 ||  || — || March 5, 2000 || Višnjan Observatory || K. Korlević || — || align=right | 3.5 km || 
|-id=122 bgcolor=#d6d6d6
| 15122 ||  || — || March 3, 2000 || Socorro || LINEAR || THM || align=right | 7.7 km || 
|-id=123 bgcolor=#d6d6d6
| 15123 ||  || — || March 8, 2000 || Socorro || LINEAR || THM || align=right | 12 km || 
|-id=124 bgcolor=#E9E9E9
| 15124 ||  || — || March 8, 2000 || Socorro || LINEAR || MIS || align=right | 9.5 km || 
|-id=125 bgcolor=#d6d6d6
| 15125 ||  || — || March 8, 2000 || Socorro || LINEAR || THM || align=right | 9.4 km || 
|-id=126 bgcolor=#fefefe
| 15126 Brittanyanderson ||  ||  || March 8, 2000 || Socorro || LINEAR || FLO || align=right | 1.7 km || 
|-id=127 bgcolor=#d6d6d6
| 15127 ||  || — || March 9, 2000 || Socorro || LINEAR || — || align=right | 19 km || 
|-id=128 bgcolor=#E9E9E9
| 15128 Patrickjones ||  ||  || March 9, 2000 || Socorro || LINEAR || — || align=right | 4.2 km || 
|-id=129 bgcolor=#fefefe
| 15129 Sparks ||  ||  || March 9, 2000 || Socorro || LINEAR || — || align=right | 2.2 km || 
|-id=130 bgcolor=#d6d6d6
| 15130 ||  || — || March 9, 2000 || Socorro || LINEAR || — || align=right | 9.8 km || 
|-id=131 bgcolor=#E9E9E9
| 15131 Alanalda ||  ||  || March 10, 2000 || Kitt Peak || Spacewatch || — || align=right | 7.3 km || 
|-id=132 bgcolor=#fefefe
| 15132 Steigmeyer ||  ||  || March 10, 2000 || Socorro || LINEAR || Vslow? || align=right | 1.8 km || 
|-id=133 bgcolor=#fefefe
| 15133 Sullivan ||  ||  || March 9, 2000 || Socorro || LINEAR || FLO || align=right | 3.9 km || 
|-id=134 bgcolor=#d6d6d6
| 15134 ||  || — || March 9, 2000 || Socorro || LINEAR || HYG || align=right | 11 km || 
|-id=135 bgcolor=#E9E9E9
| 15135 ||  || — || March 9, 2000 || Socorro || LINEAR || EUN || align=right | 6.1 km || 
|-id=136 bgcolor=#d6d6d6
| 15136 ||  || — || March 9, 2000 || Socorro || LINEAR || — || align=right | 22 km || 
|-id=137 bgcolor=#E9E9E9
| 15137 ||  || — || March 9, 2000 || Socorro || LINEAR || MAR || align=right | 6.3 km || 
|-id=138 bgcolor=#E9E9E9
| 15138 ||  || — || March 9, 2000 || Socorro || LINEAR || — || align=right | 6.6 km || 
|-id=139 bgcolor=#E9E9E9
| 15139 Connormcarty ||  ||  || March 9, 2000 || Socorro || LINEAR || ADE || align=right | 6.1 km || 
|-id=140 bgcolor=#fefefe
| 15140 ||  || — || March 10, 2000 || Socorro || LINEAR || — || align=right | 3.7 km || 
|-id=141 bgcolor=#E9E9E9
| 15141 ||  || — || March 11, 2000 || Kvistaberg || UDAS || — || align=right | 4.6 km || 
|-id=142 bgcolor=#E9E9E9
| 15142 ||  || — || March 8, 2000 || Socorro || LINEAR || GEF || align=right | 5.5 km || 
|-id=143 bgcolor=#d6d6d6
| 15143 ||  || — || March 8, 2000 || Socorro || LINEAR || EOS || align=right | 8.2 km || 
|-id=144 bgcolor=#fefefe
| 15144 Araas ||  ||  || March 9, 2000 || Socorro || LINEAR || FLO || align=right | 3.6 km || 
|-id=145 bgcolor=#fefefe
| 15145 Ritageorge ||  ||  || March 10, 2000 || Socorro || LINEAR || — || align=right | 2.8 km || 
|-id=146 bgcolor=#d6d6d6
| 15146 Halpov ||  ||  || March 11, 2000 || Anderson Mesa || LONEOS || KOR || align=right | 3.9 km || 
|-id=147 bgcolor=#d6d6d6
| 15147 Siegfried ||  ||  || March 11, 2000 || Anderson Mesa || LONEOS || — || align=right | 18 km || 
|-id=148 bgcolor=#fefefe
| 15148 Michaelmaryott ||  ||  || March 2, 2000 || Catalina || CSS || — || align=right | 3.8 km || 
|-id=149 bgcolor=#E9E9E9
| 15149 Loufaix ||  ||  || March 2, 2000 || Catalina || CSS || EUN || align=right | 6.0 km || 
|-id=150 bgcolor=#fefefe
| 15150 Salsa ||  ||  || March 4, 2000 || Catalina || CSS || FLO || align=right | 3.0 km || 
|-id=151 bgcolor=#fefefe
| 15151 Wilmacherup ||  ||  || March 4, 2000 || Catalina || CSS || NYS || align=right | 3.6 km || 
|-id=152 bgcolor=#E9E9E9
| 15152 ||  || — || March 29, 2000 || Oizumi || T. Kobayashi || — || align=right | 9.4 km || 
|-id=153 bgcolor=#d6d6d6
| 15153 ||  || — || March 28, 2000 || Socorro || LINEAR || — || align=right | 20 km || 
|-id=154 bgcolor=#E9E9E9
| 15154 ||  || — || March 27, 2000 || Kushiro || S. Ueda, H. Kaneda || — || align=right | 5.5 km || 
|-id=155 bgcolor=#fefefe
| 15155 Ahn ||  ||  || March 29, 2000 || Socorro || LINEAR || — || align=right | 2.7 km || 
|-id=156 bgcolor=#d6d6d6
| 15156 ||  || — || March 29, 2000 || Socorro || LINEAR || — || align=right | 10 km || 
|-id=157 bgcolor=#E9E9E9
| 15157 ||  || — || March 29, 2000 || Socorro || LINEAR || MAR || align=right | 4.3 km || 
|-id=158 bgcolor=#E9E9E9
| 15158 ||  || — || March 29, 2000 || Socorro || LINEAR || — || align=right | 5.0 km || 
|-id=159 bgcolor=#E9E9E9
| 15159 ||  || — || March 29, 2000 || Socorro || LINEAR || — || align=right | 4.8 km || 
|-id=160 bgcolor=#E9E9E9
| 15160 Wygoda ||  ||  || March 29, 2000 || Socorro || LINEAR || — || align=right | 4.0 km || 
|-id=161 bgcolor=#d6d6d6
| 15161 ||  || — || March 30, 2000 || Socorro || LINEAR || — || align=right | 36 km || 
|-id=162 bgcolor=#fefefe
| 15162 ||  || — || April 5, 2000 || Zeno || T. Stafford || V || align=right | 3.1 km || 
|-id=163 bgcolor=#E9E9E9
| 15163 ||  || — || April 2, 2000 || Kushiro || S. Ueda, H. Kaneda || ADE || align=right | 10 km || 
|-id=164 bgcolor=#fefefe
| 15164 ||  || — || April 4, 2000 || Socorro || LINEAR || V || align=right | 3.7 km || 
|-id=165 bgcolor=#E9E9E9
| 15165 ||  || — || April 4, 2000 || Socorro || LINEAR || EUN || align=right | 7.5 km || 
|-id=166 bgcolor=#E9E9E9
| 15166 ||  || — || April 4, 2000 || Socorro || LINEAR || EUN || align=right | 8.4 km || 
|-id=167 bgcolor=#fefefe
| 15167 ||  || — || April 8, 2000 || Socorro || LINEAR || — || align=right | 4.8 km || 
|-id=168 bgcolor=#E9E9E9
| 15168 Marijnfranx || 2022 P-L ||  || September 24, 1960 || Palomar || PLS || PAD || align=right | 8.4 km || 
|-id=169 bgcolor=#d6d6d6
| 15169 Wilfriedboland || 2629 P-L ||  || September 24, 1960 || Palomar || PLS || — || align=right | 6.4 km || 
|-id=170 bgcolor=#fefefe
| 15170 Erikdeul || 2648 P-L ||  || September 24, 1960 || Palomar || PLS || MAS || align=right | 2.3 km || 
|-id=171 bgcolor=#fefefe
| 15171 Xandertielens || 2772 P-L ||  || September 24, 1960 || Palomar || PLS || — || align=right | 2.1 km || 
|-id=172 bgcolor=#d6d6d6
| 15172 || 3086 P-L || — || September 24, 1960 || Palomar || PLS || EOS || align=right | 10 km || 
|-id=173 bgcolor=#d6d6d6
| 15173 || 3520 P-L || — || October 17, 1960 || Palomar || PLS || EOS || align=right | 7.3 km || 
|-id=174 bgcolor=#d6d6d6
| 15174 || 4649 P-L || — || September 24, 1960 || Palomar || PLS || — || align=right | 7.7 km || 
|-id=175 bgcolor=#E9E9E9
| 15175 || 6113 P-L || — || September 24, 1960 || Palomar || PLS || — || align=right | 3.2 km || 
|-id=176 bgcolor=#E9E9E9
| 15176 || 6299 P-L || — || September 24, 1960 || Palomar || PLS || — || align=right | 6.7 km || 
|-id=177 bgcolor=#E9E9E9
| 15177 || 6599 P-L || — || September 24, 1960 || Palomar || PLS || — || align=right | 4.4 km || 
|-id=178 bgcolor=#d6d6d6
| 15178 || 7075 P-L || — || October 17, 1960 || Palomar || PLS || — || align=right | 7.3 km || 
|-id=179 bgcolor=#E9E9E9
| 15179 || 9062 P-L || — || October 17, 1960 || Palomar || PLS || — || align=right | 4.9 km || 
|-id=180 bgcolor=#fefefe
| 15180 || 9094 P-L || — || October 17, 1960 || Palomar || PLS || — || align=right | 2.8 km || 
|-id=181 bgcolor=#fefefe
| 15181 || 9525 P-L || — || October 17, 1960 || Palomar || PLS || — || align=right | 2.9 km || 
|-id=182 bgcolor=#fefefe
| 15182 || 9538 P-L || — || October 17, 1960 || Palomar || PLS || — || align=right | 2.1 km || 
|-id=183 bgcolor=#d6d6d6
| 15183 || 3074 T-1 || — || March 26, 1971 || Palomar || PLS || HYG || align=right | 5.5 km || 
|-id=184 bgcolor=#d6d6d6
| 15184 || 3232 T-1 || — || March 26, 1971 || Palomar || PLS || EOS || align=right | 6.2 km || 
|-id=185 bgcolor=#E9E9E9
| 15185 || 4104 T-1 || — || March 26, 1971 || Palomar || PLS || — || align=right | 14 km || 
|-id=186 bgcolor=#fefefe
| 15186 || 2058 T-2 || — || September 29, 1973 || Palomar || PLS || — || align=right | 2.0 km || 
|-id=187 bgcolor=#d6d6d6
| 15187 || 2112 T-2 || — || September 29, 1973 || Palomar || PLS || THM || align=right | 7.8 km || 
|-id=188 bgcolor=#d6d6d6
| 15188 || 3044 T-2 || — || September 30, 1973 || Palomar || PLS || — || align=right | 11 km || 
|-id=189 bgcolor=#E9E9E9
| 15189 || 3071 T-2 || — || September 30, 1973 || Palomar || PLS || — || align=right | 3.4 km || 
|-id=190 bgcolor=#d6d6d6
| 15190 || 3353 T-2 || — || September 25, 1973 || Palomar || PLS || — || align=right | 11 km || 
|-id=191 bgcolor=#d6d6d6
| 15191 || 4234 T-2 || — || September 29, 1973 || Palomar || PLS || HYG || align=right | 13 km || 
|-id=192 bgcolor=#fefefe
| 15192 || 5049 T-2 || — || September 25, 1973 || Palomar || PLS || — || align=right | 2.6 km || 
|-id=193 bgcolor=#fefefe
| 15193 || 5148 T-2 || — || September 25, 1973 || Palomar || PLS || — || align=right | 3.4 km || 
|-id=194 bgcolor=#fefefe
| 15194 || 2272 T-3 || — || October 16, 1977 || Palomar || PLS || FLO || align=right | 2.4 km || 
|-id=195 bgcolor=#d6d6d6
| 15195 || 2407 T-3 || — || October 16, 1977 || Palomar || PLS || KOR || align=right | 3.9 km || 
|-id=196 bgcolor=#d6d6d6
| 15196 || 3178 T-3 || — || October 16, 1977 || Palomar || PLS || — || align=right | 4.0 km || 
|-id=197 bgcolor=#E9E9E9
| 15197 || 4203 T-3 || — || October 16, 1977 || Palomar || PLS || EUN || align=right | 3.6 km || 
|-id=198 bgcolor=#fefefe
| 15198 || 1940 GJ || — || April 5, 1940 || Turku || L. Oterma || PHO || align=right | 4.3 km || 
|-id=199 bgcolor=#fefefe
| 15199 Rodnyanskaya || 1974 SE ||  || September 19, 1974 || Nauchnij || L. I. Chernykh || — || align=right | 3.9 km || 
|-id=200 bgcolor=#d6d6d6
| 15200 || 1975 SU || — || September 30, 1975 || Palomar || S. J. Bus || — || align=right | 20 km || 
|}

15201–15300 

|-bgcolor=#E9E9E9
| 15201 || 1976 UY || — || October 31, 1976 || La Silla || R. M. West || — || align=right | 4.0 km || 
|-id=202 bgcolor=#fefefe
| 15202 Yamada-Houkoku ||  ||  || March 12, 1977 || Kiso || H. Kosai, K. Furukawa || KLI || align=right | 8.1 km || 
|-id=203 bgcolor=#fefefe
| 15203 Grishanin ||  ||  || September 26, 1978 || Nauchnij || L. V. Zhuravleva || NYS || align=right | 9.6 km || 
|-id=204 bgcolor=#fefefe
| 15204 || 1978 UG || — || October 28, 1978 || Anderson Mesa || H. L. Giclas || NYS || align=right | 3.1 km || 
|-id=205 bgcolor=#d6d6d6
| 15205 ||  || — || November 7, 1978 || Palomar || E. F. Helin, S. J. Bus || KOR || align=right | 3.9 km || 
|-id=206 bgcolor=#E9E9E9
| 15206 ||  || — || November 6, 1978 || Palomar || E. F. Helin, S. J. Bus || — || align=right | 4.8 km || 
|-id=207 bgcolor=#E9E9E9
| 15207 || 1979 KD || — || May 19, 1979 || La Silla || R. M. West || RAF || align=right | 6.5 km || 
|-id=208 bgcolor=#E9E9E9
| 15208 ||  || — || June 25, 1979 || Siding Spring || E. F. Helin, S. J. Bus || — || align=right | 6.8 km || 
|-id=209 bgcolor=#d6d6d6
| 15209 ||  || — || June 25, 1979 || Siding Spring || E. F. Helin, S. J. Bus || — || align=right | 7.0 km || 
|-id=210 bgcolor=#d6d6d6
| 15210 ||  || — || June 25, 1979 || Siding Spring || E. F. Helin, S. J. Bus || HYG || align=right | 6.9 km || 
|-id=211 bgcolor=#fefefe
| 15211 ||  || — || June 25, 1979 || Siding Spring || E. F. Helin, S. J. Bus || — || align=right | 2.2 km || 
|-id=212 bgcolor=#E9E9E9
| 15212 Yaroslavlʹ ||  ||  || November 17, 1979 || Nauchnij || L. I. Chernykh || GEF || align=right | 7.0 km || 
|-id=213 bgcolor=#d6d6d6
| 15213 ||  || — || October 31, 1980 || Palomar || S. J. Bus || — || align=right | 16 km || 
|-id=214 bgcolor=#E9E9E9
| 15214 || 1981 DY || — || February 28, 1981 || Siding Spring || S. J. Bus || — || align=right | 8.6 km || 
|-id=215 bgcolor=#fefefe
| 15215 ||  || — || March 1, 1981 || Siding Spring || S. J. Bus || — || align=right | 2.6 km || 
|-id=216 bgcolor=#E9E9E9
| 15216 ||  || — || March 1, 1981 || Siding Spring || S. J. Bus || GEF || align=right | 2.6 km || 
|-id=217 bgcolor=#fefefe
| 15217 ||  || — || March 2, 1981 || Siding Spring || S. J. Bus || MAS || align=right | 1.6 km || 
|-id=218 bgcolor=#E9E9E9
| 15218 ||  || — || March 2, 1981 || Siding Spring || S. J. Bus || — || align=right | 6.3 km || 
|-id=219 bgcolor=#fefefe
| 15219 ||  || — || March 2, 1981 || Siding Spring || S. J. Bus || MAS || align=right | 1.8 km || 
|-id=220 bgcolor=#E9E9E9
| 15220 Sumerkin ||  ||  || September 28, 1981 || Nauchnij || L. V. Zhuravleva || — || align=right | 4.9 km || 
|-id=221 bgcolor=#fefefe
| 15221 ||  || — || October 24, 1981 || Palomar || S. J. Bus || — || align=right | 2.4 km || 
|-id=222 bgcolor=#d6d6d6
| 15222 ||  || — || March 24, 1982 || Kleť || A. Mrkos || THM || align=right | 15 km || 
|-id=223 bgcolor=#E9E9E9
| 15223 ||  || — || September 21, 1984 || La Silla || H. Debehogne || — || align=right | 4.1 km || 
|-id=224 bgcolor=#fefefe
| 15224 Penttilä || 1985 JG ||  || May 15, 1985 || Anderson Mesa || E. Bowell || — || align=right | 7.9 km || 
|-id=225 bgcolor=#d6d6d6
| 15225 ||  || — || September 11, 1985 || La Silla || H. Debehogne || — || align=right | 10 km || 
|-id=226 bgcolor=#fefefe
| 15226 || 1986 UP || — || October 28, 1986 || Kleť || Z. Vávrová || PHOfast || align=right | 4.2 km || 
|-id=227 bgcolor=#d6d6d6
| 15227 || 1986 VA || — || November 4, 1986 || Siding Spring || R. H. McNaught || EOS || align=right | 8.5 km || 
|-id=228 bgcolor=#fefefe
| 15228 Ronmiller || 1987 DG ||  || February 23, 1987 || Palomar || C. S. Shoemaker, E. M. Shoemaker || — || align=right | 2.4 km || 
|-id=229 bgcolor=#fefefe
| 15229 ||  || — || August 22, 1987 || La Silla || E. W. Elst || — || align=right | 3.6 km || 
|-id=230 bgcolor=#fefefe
| 15230 Alona ||  ||  || September 13, 1987 || La Silla || H. Debehogne || FLO || align=right | 3.4 km || 
|-id=231 bgcolor=#d6d6d6
| 15231 Ehdita ||  ||  || September 4, 1987 || Nauchnij || L. V. Zhuravleva || 3:2 || align=right | 23 km || 
|-id=232 bgcolor=#fefefe
| 15232 ||  || — || September 24, 1987 || La Silla || H. Debehogne || — || align=right | 6.8 km || 
|-id=233 bgcolor=#E9E9E9
| 15233 ||  || — || November 26, 1987 || Kleť || A. Mrkos || — || align=right | 3.8 km || 
|-id=234 bgcolor=#E9E9E9
| 15234 ||  || — || January 28, 1988 || Siding Spring || R. H. McNaught || — || align=right | 4.7 km || 
|-id=235 bgcolor=#d6d6d6
| 15235 ||  || — || February 25, 1988 || Siding Spring || R. H. McNaught || — || align=right | 13 km || 
|-id=236 bgcolor=#E9E9E9
| 15236 ||  || — || September 1, 1988 || La Silla || H. Debehogne || — || align=right | 3.5 km || 
|-id=237 bgcolor=#fefefe
| 15237 ||  || — || September 6, 1988 || La Silla || H. Debehogne || V || align=right | 2.6 km || 
|-id=238 bgcolor=#fefefe
| 15238 Hisaohori || 1989 CQ ||  || February 2, 1989 || Geisei || T. Seki || — || align=right | 2.7 km || 
|-id=239 bgcolor=#d6d6d6
| 15239 Stenhammar ||  ||  || February 4, 1989 || La Silla || E. W. Elst || EOS || align=right | 7.1 km || 
|-id=240 bgcolor=#fefefe
| 15240 ||  || — || April 3, 1989 || La Silla || E. W. Elst || — || align=right | 2.4 km || 
|-id=241 bgcolor=#E9E9E9
| 15241 ||  || — || September 26, 1989 || La Silla || E. W. Elst || slow? || align=right | 2.8 km || 
|-id=242 bgcolor=#E9E9E9
| 15242 ||  || — || September 26, 1989 || La Silla || E. W. Elst || — || align=right | 3.6 km || 
|-id=243 bgcolor=#E9E9E9
| 15243 ||  || — || October 9, 1989 || Gekko || Y. Oshima || — || align=right | 9.7 km || 
|-id=244 bgcolor=#E9E9E9
| 15244 ||  || — || October 7, 1989 || La Silla || E. W. Elst || — || align=right | 4.0 km || 
|-id=245 bgcolor=#d6d6d6
| 15245 ||  || — || October 4, 1989 || La Silla || H. Debehogne || THM || align=right | 11 km || 
|-id=246 bgcolor=#E9E9E9
| 15246 Kumeta ||  ||  || November 2, 1989 || Kitami || K. Endate, K. Watanabe || MIS || align=right | 8.0 km || 
|-id=247 bgcolor=#E9E9E9
| 15247 || 1989 WS || — || November 20, 1989 || Kushiro || S. Ueda, H. Kaneda || — || align=right | 4.4 km || 
|-id=248 bgcolor=#E9E9E9
| 15248 Hidekazu ||  ||  || November 29, 1989 || Kitami || K. Endate, K. Watanabe || — || align=right | 4.4 km || 
|-id=249 bgcolor=#d6d6d6
| 15249 Capodimonte ||  ||  || December 28, 1989 || Haute Provence || E. W. Elst || — || align=right | 21 km || 
|-id=250 bgcolor=#d6d6d6
| 15250 Nishiyamahiro || 1990 DZ ||  || February 28, 1990 || Kitami || K. Endate, K. Watanabe || — || align=right | 4.9 km || 
|-id=251 bgcolor=#fefefe
| 15251 ||  || — || March 2, 1990 || La Silla || E. W. Elst || — || align=right | 2.1 km || 
|-id=252 bgcolor=#fefefe
| 15252 Yoshiken ||  ||  || July 20, 1990 || Geisei || T. Seki || — || align=right | 3.4 km || 
|-id=253 bgcolor=#fefefe
| 15253 ||  || — || August 23, 1990 || Palomar || H. E. Holt || — || align=right | 7.1 km || 
|-id=254 bgcolor=#fefefe
| 15254 ||  || — || August 23, 1990 || Palomar || H. E. Holt || FLO || align=right | 4.0 km || 
|-id=255 bgcolor=#d6d6d6
| 15255 ||  || — || August 16, 1990 || La Silla || E. W. Elst || THM || align=right | 9.5 km || 
|-id=256 bgcolor=#d6d6d6
| 15256 ||  || — || September 14, 1990 || Palomar || H. E. Holt || VER || align=right | 15 km || 
|-id=257 bgcolor=#d6d6d6
| 15257 ||  || — || September 15, 1990 || La Silla || H. Debehogne || THM || align=right | 8.4 km || 
|-id=258 bgcolor=#d6d6d6
| 15258 Alfilipenko ||  ||  || September 15, 1990 || Nauchnij || L. V. Zhuravleva || — || align=right | 12 km || 
|-id=259 bgcolor=#fefefe
| 15259 ||  || — || September 22, 1990 || La Silla || E. W. Elst || NYS || align=right | 2.4 km || 
|-id=260 bgcolor=#fefefe
| 15260 ||  || — || September 22, 1990 || La Silla || E. W. Elst || FLO || align=right | 2.4 km || 
|-id=261 bgcolor=#d6d6d6
| 15261 ||  || — || September 21, 1990 || La Silla || H. Debehogne || THM || align=right | 11 km || 
|-id=262 bgcolor=#d6d6d6
| 15262 Abderhalden ||  ||  || October 12, 1990 || Tautenburg Observatory || F. Börngen, L. D. Schmadel || THM || align=right | 12 km || 
|-id=263 bgcolor=#fefefe
| 15263 Erwingroten ||  ||  || October 13, 1990 || Tautenburg Observatory || L. D. Schmadel, F. Börngen || NYS || align=right | 3.2 km || 
|-id=264 bgcolor=#fefefe
| 15264 Delbrück ||  ||  || October 11, 1990 || Tautenburg Observatory || F. Börngen, L. D. Schmadel || NYS || align=right | 5.8 km || 
|-id=265 bgcolor=#fefefe
| 15265 Ernsting ||  ||  || October 12, 1990 || Tautenburg Observatory || L. D. Schmadel, F. Börngen || CHL || align=right | 6.3 km || 
|-id=266 bgcolor=#fefefe
| 15266 ||  || — || October 16, 1990 || La Silla || E. W. Elst || — || align=right | 3.0 km || 
|-id=267 bgcolor=#fefefe
| 15267 Kolyma ||  ||  || November 15, 1990 || La Silla || E. W. Elst || — || align=right | 7.4 km || 
|-id=268 bgcolor=#fefefe
| 15268 Wendelinefroger ||  ||  || November 18, 1990 || La Silla || E. W. Elst || NYSmoon || align=right | 2.9 km || 
|-id=269 bgcolor=#E9E9E9
| 15269 || 1990 XF || — || December 8, 1990 || Yatsugatake || Y. Kushida, O. Muramatsu || — || align=right | 11 km || 
|-id=270 bgcolor=#E9E9E9
| 15270 ||  || — || January 7, 1991 || Siding Spring || R. H. McNaught || — || align=right | 4.6 km || 
|-id=271 bgcolor=#E9E9E9
| 15271 || 1991 DE || — || February 19, 1991 || Oohira || T. Urata || — || align=right | 7.4 km || 
|-id=272 bgcolor=#E9E9E9
| 15272 || 1991 GH || — || April 3, 1991 || Dynic || A. Sugie || — || align=right | 7.0 km || 
|-id=273 bgcolor=#E9E9E9
| 15273 Ruhmkorff ||  ||  || April 8, 1991 || La Silla || E. W. Elst || — || align=right | 5.5 km || 
|-id=274 bgcolor=#E9E9E9
| 15274 ||  || — || April 8, 1991 || La Silla || E. W. Elst || MARslow || align=right | 5.1 km || 
|-id=275 bgcolor=#E9E9E9
| 15275 ||  || — || April 8, 1991 || La Silla || E. W. Elst || — || align=right | 5.2 km || 
|-id=276 bgcolor=#E9E9E9
| 15276 Diebel ||  ||  || April 14, 1991 || Palomar || C. S. Shoemaker, D. H. Levy || — || align=right | 7.4 km || 
|-id=277 bgcolor=#d6d6d6
| 15277 ||  || — || August 6, 1991 || La Silla || E. W. Elst || KOR || align=right | 5.9 km || 
|-id=278 bgcolor=#d6d6d6
| 15278 Pâquet ||  ||  || August 6, 1991 || La Silla || E. W. Elst || 3:2 || align=right | 25 km || 
|-id=279 bgcolor=#fefefe
| 15279 ||  || — || August 6, 1991 || La Silla || E. W. Elst || — || align=right | 2.3 km || 
|-id=280 bgcolor=#fefefe
| 15280 ||  || — || August 7, 1991 || Palomar || H. E. Holt || — || align=right | 3.6 km || 
|-id=281 bgcolor=#d6d6d6
| 15281 ||  || — || August 7, 1991 || Palomar || H. E. Holt || KOR || align=right | 7.4 km || 
|-id=282 bgcolor=#d6d6d6
| 15282 Franzmarc ||  ||  || September 13, 1991 || Tautenburg Observatory || F. Börngen, L. D. Schmadel || — || align=right | 6.8 km || 
|-id=283 bgcolor=#fefefe
| 15283 ||  || — || September 12, 1991 || Palomar || H. E. Holt || FLO || align=right | 3.5 km || 
|-id=284 bgcolor=#fefefe
| 15284 ||  || — || September 15, 1991 || Palomar || H. E. Holt || — || align=right | 2.6 km || 
|-id=285 bgcolor=#d6d6d6
| 15285 ||  || — || September 14, 1991 || Palomar || H. E. Holt || — || align=right | 10 km || 
|-id=286 bgcolor=#fefefe
| 15286 ||  || — || September 15, 1991 || Palomar || H. E. Holt || — || align=right | 3.2 km || 
|-id=287 bgcolor=#fefefe
| 15287 ||  || — || September 12, 1991 || Palomar || H. E. Holt || — || align=right | 2.8 km || 
|-id=288 bgcolor=#E9E9E9
| 15288 ||  || — || September 11, 1991 || Palomar || H. E. Holt || MAR || align=right | 8.4 km || 
|-id=289 bgcolor=#fefefe
| 15289 || 1991 TL || — || October 1, 1991 || Siding Spring || R. H. McNaught || — || align=right | 2.5 km || 
|-id=290 bgcolor=#d6d6d6
| 15290 ||  || — || October 12, 1991 || Siding Spring || R. H. McNaught || — || align=right | 13 km || 
|-id=291 bgcolor=#fefefe
| 15291 ||  || — || November 4, 1991 || Kushiro || S. Ueda, H. Kaneda || FLO || align=right | 3.2 km || 
|-id=292 bgcolor=#d6d6d6
| 15292 ||  || — || November 9, 1991 || Kushiro || S. Ueda, H. Kaneda || THM || align=right | 12 km || 
|-id=293 bgcolor=#fefefe
| 15293 ||  || — || November 4, 1991 || Kushiro || S. Ueda, H. Kaneda || — || align=right | 6.8 km || 
|-id=294 bgcolor=#fefefe
| 15294 Underwood ||  ||  || November 7, 1991 || Palomar || C. S. Shoemaker, D. H. Levy || — || align=right | 3.2 km || 
|-id=295 bgcolor=#fefefe
| 15295 Tante Riek ||  ||  || November 4, 1991 || Kitt Peak || Spacewatch || V || align=right | 3.0 km || 
|-id=296 bgcolor=#fefefe
| 15296 Tantetruus ||  ||  || January 2, 1992 || Kitt Peak || Spacewatch || MAS || align=right | 2.1 km || 
|-id=297 bgcolor=#fefefe
| 15297 || 1992 CF || — || February 8, 1992 || Kiyosato || S. Otomo || — || align=right | 4.8 km || 
|-id=298 bgcolor=#fefefe
| 15298 ||  || — || March 2, 1992 || La Silla || UESAC || — || align=right | 4.1 km || 
|-id=299 bgcolor=#fefefe
| 15299 ||  || — || March 1, 1992 || La Silla || UESAC || NYS || align=right | 3.6 km || 
|-id=300 bgcolor=#E9E9E9
| 15300 ||  || — || September 2, 1992 || La Silla || E. W. Elst || — || align=right | 8.3 km || 
|}

15301–15400 

|-bgcolor=#d6d6d6
| 15301 Marutesser ||  ||  || September 21, 1992 || Tautenburg Observatory || L. D. Schmadel, F. Börngen || KOR || align=right | 4.1 km || 
|-id=302 bgcolor=#E9E9E9
| 15302 ||  || — || October 2, 1992 || Palomar || H. E. Holt || EUN || align=right | 7.7 km || 
|-id=303 bgcolor=#d6d6d6
| 15303 Hatoyamamachi ||  ||  || October 19, 1992 || Kitami || K. Endate, K. Watanabe || EOS || align=right | 8.5 km || 
|-id=304 bgcolor=#d6d6d6
| 15304 Wikberg ||  ||  || October 21, 1992 || Palomar || C. S. Shoemaker, E. M. Shoemaker || — || align=right | 11 km || 
|-id=305 bgcolor=#E9E9E9
| 15305 ||  || — || November 18, 1992 || Dynic || A. Sugie || — || align=right | 13 km || 
|-id=306 bgcolor=#fefefe
| 15306 ||  || — || November 18, 1992 || Kushiro || S. Ueda, H. Kaneda || — || align=right | 2.8 km || 
|-id=307 bgcolor=#fefefe
| 15307 || 1992 XK || — || December 15, 1992 || Kiyosato || S. Otomo || NYS || align=right | 3.2 km || 
|-id=308 bgcolor=#fefefe
| 15308 ||  || — || March 17, 1993 || La Silla || UESAC || — || align=right | 2.6 km || 
|-id=309 bgcolor=#fefefe
| 15309 ||  || — || March 17, 1993 || La Silla || UESAC || — || align=right | 1.9 km || 
|-id=310 bgcolor=#fefefe
| 15310 ||  || — || March 17, 1993 || La Silla || UESAC || — || align=right | 3.5 km || 
|-id=311 bgcolor=#fefefe
| 15311 ||  || — || March 21, 1993 || La Silla || UESAC || — || align=right | 2.5 km || 
|-id=312 bgcolor=#E9E9E9
| 15312 ||  || — || March 21, 1993 || La Silla || UESAC || slow || align=right | 8.8 km || 
|-id=313 bgcolor=#fefefe
| 15313 ||  || — || March 21, 1993 || La Silla || UESAC || NYS || align=right | 1.9 km || 
|-id=314 bgcolor=#d6d6d6
| 15314 ||  || — || March 17, 1993 || La Silla || UESAC || 7:4 || align=right | 13 km || 
|-id=315 bgcolor=#fefefe
| 15315 ||  || — || March 19, 1993 || La Silla || UESAC || PHO || align=right | 3.9 km || 
|-id=316 bgcolor=#fefefe
| 15316 Okagakimachi ||  ||  || April 20, 1993 || Kitami || K. Endate, K. Watanabe || — || align=right | 3.3 km || 
|-id=317 bgcolor=#fefefe
| 15317 ||  || — || April 23, 1993 || Palomar || E. F. Helin || — || align=right | 5.1 km || 
|-id=318 bgcolor=#fefefe
| 15318 Innsbruck ||  ||  || May 24, 1993 || Palomar || C. S. Shoemaker || PHO || align=right | 6.1 km || 
|-id=319 bgcolor=#fefefe
| 15319 ||  || — || July 12, 1993 || La Silla || E. W. Elst || NYS || align=right | 2.5 km || 
|-id=320 bgcolor=#fefefe
| 15320 ||  || — || July 20, 1993 || La Silla || E. W. Elst || MAS || align=right | 2.2 km || 
|-id=321 bgcolor=#fefefe
| 15321 Donnadean ||  ||  || August 13, 1993 || Palomar || C. S. Shoemaker, D. H. Levy || — || align=right | 4.9 km || 
|-id=322 bgcolor=#E9E9E9
| 15322 || 1993 QY || — || August 16, 1993 || Caussols || E. W. Elst || — || align=right | 5.1 km || 
|-id=323 bgcolor=#d6d6d6
| 15323 ||  || — || August 18, 1993 || Caussols || E. W. Elst || THM || align=right | 8.2 km || 
|-id=324 bgcolor=#d6d6d6
| 15324 ||  || — || August 18, 1993 || Caussols || E. W. Elst || THM || align=right | 7.4 km || 
|-id=325 bgcolor=#fefefe
| 15325 ||  || — || August 20, 1993 || La Silla || E. W. Elst || — || align=right | 3.2 km || 
|-id=326 bgcolor=#fefefe
| 15326 ||  || — || August 20, 1993 || La Silla || E. W. Elst || NYS || align=right | 3.2 km || 
|-id=327 bgcolor=#E9E9E9
| 15327 ||  || — || September 14, 1993 || Palomar || E. F. Helin || EUN || align=right | 5.1 km || 
|-id=328 bgcolor=#fefefe
| 15328 ||  || — || September 14, 1993 || La Silla || H. Debehogne, E. W. Elst || NYS || align=right | 2.6 km || 
|-id=329 bgcolor=#d6d6d6
| 15329 Sabena ||  ||  || September 17, 1993 || La Silla || E. W. Elst || — || align=right | 7.1 km || 
|-id=330 bgcolor=#E9E9E9
| 15330 de Almeida || 1993 TO ||  || October 8, 1993 || Kitami || K. Endate, K. Watanabe || — || align=right | 8.9 km || 
|-id=331 bgcolor=#E9E9E9
| 15331 ||  || — || October 9, 1993 || La Silla || E. W. Elst || — || align=right | 6.9 km || 
|-id=332 bgcolor=#E9E9E9
| 15332 CERN ||  ||  || October 9, 1993 || La Silla || E. W. Elst || — || align=right | 6.2 km || 
|-id=333 bgcolor=#E9E9E9
| 15333 ||  || — || October 13, 1993 || Palomar || H. E. Holt || — || align=right | 9.3 km || 
|-id=334 bgcolor=#fefefe
| 15334 || 1993 UE || — || October 20, 1993 || Siding Spring || R. H. McNaught || — || align=right | 4.6 km || 
|-id=335 bgcolor=#E9E9E9
| 15335 Satoyukie || 1993 UV ||  || October 23, 1993 || Oizumi || T. Kobayashi || JUN || align=right | 3.6 km || 
|-id=336 bgcolor=#E9E9E9
| 15336 ||  || — || October 22, 1993 || Nyukasa || M. Hirasawa, S. Suzuki || — || align=right | 6.8 km || 
|-id=337 bgcolor=#fefefe
| 15337 ||  || — || November 7, 1993 || Siding Spring || R. H. McNaught || PHO || align=right | 5.2 km || 
|-id=338 bgcolor=#d6d6d6
| 15338 Dufault ||  ||  || January 5, 1994 || Kitt Peak || Spacewatch || — || align=right | 3.9 km || 
|-id=339 bgcolor=#d6d6d6
| 15339 Pierazzo ||  ||  || January 8, 1994 || Kitt Peak || Spacewatch || KOR || align=right | 5.0 km || 
|-id=340 bgcolor=#d6d6d6
| 15340 ||  || — || February 8, 1994 || La Silla || E. W. Elst || — || align=right | 5.5 km || 
|-id=341 bgcolor=#d6d6d6
| 15341 ||  || — || February 8, 1994 || La Silla || E. W. Elst || KOR || align=right | 5.2 km || 
|-id=342 bgcolor=#d6d6d6
| 15342 Assisi ||  ||  || April 3, 1994 || Tautenburg Observatory || F. Börngen || THM || align=right | 8.6 km || 
|-id=343 bgcolor=#fefefe
| 15343 Von Wohlgemuth ||  ||  || August 15, 1994 || Farra d'Isonzo || Farra d'Isonzo || — || align=right | 2.3 km || 
|-id=344 bgcolor=#fefefe
| 15344 ||  || — || August 9, 1994 || Palomar || PCAS || — || align=right | 2.9 km || 
|-id=345 bgcolor=#fefefe
| 15345 ||  || — || August 10, 1994 || La Silla || E. W. Elst || ERI || align=right | 8.1 km || 
|-id=346 bgcolor=#fefefe
| 15346 Bonifatius ||  ||  || September 2, 1994 || Tautenburg Observatory || F. Börngen || V || align=right | 2.2 km || 
|-id=347 bgcolor=#fefefe
| 15347 Colinstuart || 1994 UD ||  || October 26, 1994 || Stakenbridge || B. G. W. Manning || ERI || align=right | 4.4 km || 
|-id=348 bgcolor=#fefefe
| 15348 || 1994 UJ || — || October 31, 1994 || Oizumi || T. Kobayashi || NYS || align=right | 2.6 km || 
|-id=349 bgcolor=#fefefe
| 15349 ||  || — || October 31, 1994 || Kushiro || S. Ueda, H. Kaneda || NYS || align=right | 3.4 km || 
|-id=350 bgcolor=#fefefe
| 15350 Naganuma ||  ||  || November 3, 1994 || Yatsugatake || Y. Kushida, O. Muramatsu || — || align=right | 4.4 km || 
|-id=351 bgcolor=#fefefe
| 15351 Yamaguchimamoru ||  ||  || November 4, 1994 || Kitami || K. Endate, K. Watanabe || — || align=right | 3.8 km || 
|-id=352 bgcolor=#fefefe
| 15352 ||  || — || November 11, 1994 || Nyukasa || M. Hirasawa, S. Suzuki || — || align=right | 2.9 km || 
|-id=353 bgcolor=#fefefe
| 15353 Meucci || 1994 WA ||  || November 22, 1994 || Colleverde || V. S. Casulli || — || align=right | 3.5 km || 
|-id=354 bgcolor=#fefefe
| 15354 ||  || — || December 31, 1994 || Oizumi || T. Kobayashi || NYS || align=right | 5.6 km || 
|-id=355 bgcolor=#fefefe
| 15355 Maupassant ||  ||  || January 2, 1995 || Caussols || E. W. Elst || — || align=right | 5.0 km || 
|-id=356 bgcolor=#E9E9E9
| 15356 || 1995 DE || — || February 20, 1995 || Oizumi || T. Kobayashi || MAR || align=right | 5.2 km || 
|-id=357 bgcolor=#E9E9E9
| 15357 || 1995 FM || — || March 26, 1995 || Nachi-Katsuura || Y. Shimizu, T. Urata || — || align=right | 6.8 km || 
|-id=358 bgcolor=#E9E9E9
| 15358 Kintner ||  ||  || March 26, 1995 || Kitt Peak || Spacewatch || — || align=right | 8.5 km || 
|-id=359 bgcolor=#E9E9E9
| 15359 Dressler ||  ||  || April 2, 1995 || Kitt Peak || Spacewatch || — || align=right | 7.0 km || 
|-id=360 bgcolor=#fefefe
| 15360 Moncalvo ||  ||  || February 14, 1996 || Cima Ekar || M. Tombelli, G. Forti || — || align=right | 2.2 km || 
|-id=361 bgcolor=#E9E9E9
| 15361 ||  || — || February 23, 1996 || Oizumi || T. Kobayashi || — || align=right | 3.3 km || 
|-id=362 bgcolor=#fefefe
| 15362 || 1996 ED || — || March 9, 1996 || Oizumi || T. Kobayashi || FLO || align=right | 4.5 km || 
|-id=363 bgcolor=#fefefe
| 15363 Ysaye ||  ||  || March 18, 1996 || Kitt Peak || Spacewatch || — || align=right | 2.5 km || 
|-id=364 bgcolor=#fefefe
| 15364 Kenglover ||  ||  || April 17, 1996 || Kitt Peak || Spacewatch || — || align=right | 3.5 km || 
|-id=365 bgcolor=#fefefe
| 15365 ||  || — || April 17, 1996 || La Silla || E. W. Elst || — || align=right | 7.8 km || 
|-id=366 bgcolor=#E9E9E9
| 15366 ||  || — || April 18, 1996 || La Silla || E. W. Elst || EUN || align=right | 3.8 km || 
|-id=367 bgcolor=#fefefe
| 15367 ||  || — || April 20, 1996 || La Silla || E. W. Elst || — || align=right | 3.0 km || 
|-id=368 bgcolor=#fefefe
| 15368 Katsuji || 1996 JZ ||  || May 14, 1996 || Moriyama || R. H. McNaught, Y. Ikari || — || align=right | 6.2 km || 
|-id=369 bgcolor=#E9E9E9
| 15369 || 1996 KB || — || May 16, 1996 || Haleakala || NEAT || — || align=right | 5.6 km || 
|-id=370 bgcolor=#E9E9E9
| 15370 Kanchi || 1996 NW ||  || July 15, 1996 || Kuma Kogen || A. Nakamura || — || align=right | 5.4 km || 
|-id=371 bgcolor=#d6d6d6
| 15371 Steward ||  ||  || September 15, 1996 || Kitt Peak || Spacewatch || — || align=right | 7.2 km || 
|-id=372 bgcolor=#d6d6d6
| 15372 Agrigento ||  ||  || October 8, 1996 || La Silla || E. W. Elst || 7:4 || align=right | 12 km || 
|-id=373 bgcolor=#d6d6d6
| 15373 ||  || — || November 20, 1996 || Xinglong || SCAP || HIL3:2 || align=right | 13 km || 
|-id=374 bgcolor=#fefefe
| 15374 Teta || 1997 BG ||  || January 16, 1997 || Kleť || M. Tichý, Z. Moravec || H || align=right | 3.7 km || 
|-id=375 bgcolor=#fefefe
| 15375 Laetitiafoglia ||  ||  || January 30, 1997 || Cima Ekar || U. Munari, M. Tombelli || FLO || align=right | 2.4 km || 
|-id=376 bgcolor=#d6d6d6
| 15376 Marták ||  ||  || February 1, 1997 || Modra || P. Kolény, L. Kornoš || Tj (2.97) || align=right | 18 km || 
|-id=377 bgcolor=#fefefe
| 15377 || 1997 KW || — || May 31, 1997 || Xinglong || SCAP || FLO || align=right | 2.3 km || 
|-id=378 bgcolor=#E9E9E9
| 15378 Artin ||  ||  || August 7, 1997 || Prescott || P. G. Comba || — || align=right | 2.2 km || 
|-id=379 bgcolor=#fefefe
| 15379 Alefranz ||  ||  || August 29, 1997 || Sormano || P. Sicoli, P. Chiavenna || — || align=right | 4.0 km || 
|-id=380 bgcolor=#E9E9E9
| 15380 ||  || — || August 30, 1997 || Caussols || ODAS || — || align=right | 3.1 km || 
|-id=381 bgcolor=#fefefe
| 15381 Spadolini ||  ||  || September 1, 1997 || Pianoro || V. Goretti || — || align=right | 3.0 km || 
|-id=382 bgcolor=#fefefe
| 15382 Vian || 1997 SN ||  || September 20, 1997 || Ondřejov || L. Kotková || V || align=right | 2.1 km || 
|-id=383 bgcolor=#E9E9E9
| 15383 ||  || — || September 21, 1997 || Woomera || F. B. Zoltowski || — || align=right | 4.2 km || 
|-id=384 bgcolor=#d6d6d6
| 15384 Samková ||  ||  || September 26, 1997 || Ondřejov || P. Pravec || KOR || align=right | 3.8 km || 
|-id=385 bgcolor=#d6d6d6
| 15385 Dallolmo ||  ||  || September 25, 1997 || Bologna || San Vittore Obs. || EOS || align=right | 5.2 km || 
|-id=386 bgcolor=#fefefe
| 15386 Nicolini ||  ||  || September 25, 1997 || Dossobuono || Madonna di Dossobuono Obs. || V || align=right | 1.9 km || 
|-id=387 bgcolor=#fefefe
| 15387 Hanazukayama ||  ||  || September 30, 1997 || Nanyo || T. Okuni || — || align=right | 6.1 km || 
|-id=388 bgcolor=#fefefe
| 15388 Coelum ||  ||  || September 27, 1997 || Bologna || San Vittore Obs. || NYS || align=right | 2.0 km || 
|-id=389 bgcolor=#fefefe
| 15389 Geflorsch ||  ||  || October 2, 1997 || Caussols || ODAS || NYS || align=right | 2.1 km || 
|-id=390 bgcolor=#E9E9E9
| 15390 Znojil ||  ||  || October 6, 1997 || Ondřejov || P. Pravec || — || align=right | 3.2 km || 
|-id=391 bgcolor=#fefefe
| 15391 Steliomancinelli ||  ||  || October 3, 1997 || Stroncone || A. Vagnozzi || — || align=right | 3.0 km || 
|-id=392 bgcolor=#fefefe
| 15392 Budějický ||  ||  || October 11, 1997 || Ondřejov || L. Kotková || — || align=right | 2.9 km || 
|-id=393 bgcolor=#d6d6d6
| 15393 ||  || — || October 9, 1997 || Xinglong || SCAP || — || align=right | 13 km || 
|-id=394 bgcolor=#E9E9E9
| 15394 ||  || — || October 12, 1997 || Xinglong || SCAP || — || align=right | 5.5 km || 
|-id=395 bgcolor=#d6d6d6
| 15395 Rükl || 1997 UV ||  || October 21, 1997 || Ondřejov || P. Pravec || THM || align=right | 7.3 km || 
|-id=396 bgcolor=#E9E9E9
| 15396 Howardmoore ||  ||  || October 24, 1997 || Prescott || P. G. Comba || — || align=right | 4.8 km || 
|-id=397 bgcolor=#E9E9E9
| 15397 Ksoari ||  ||  || October 27, 1997 || Heppenheim || Starkenburg Obs. || — || align=right | 3.2 km || 
|-id=398 bgcolor=#C2FFFF
| 15398 ||  || — || October 30, 1997 || Anderson Mesa || B. A. Skiff || L4 || align=right | 36 km || 
|-id=399 bgcolor=#E9E9E9
| 15399 Hudec || 1997 VE ||  || November 2, 1997 || Kleť || J. Tichá, M. Tichý || MIS || align=right | 8.6 km || 
|-id=400 bgcolor=#d6d6d6
| 15400 || 1997 VZ || — || November 1, 1997 || Oizumi || T. Kobayashi || — || align=right | 9.5 km || 
|}

15401–15500 

|-bgcolor=#E9E9E9
| 15401 ||  || — || November 4, 1997 || Gekko || T. Kagawa, T. Urata || — || align=right | 9.8 km || 
|-id=402 bgcolor=#fefefe
| 15402 Suzaku ||  ||  || November 9, 1997 || Moriyama || Y. Ikari || MAS || align=right | 2.9 km || 
|-id=403 bgcolor=#E9E9E9
| 15403 Merignac ||  ||  || November 9, 1997 || Ondřejov || L. Kotková || — || align=right | 4.9 km || 
|-id=404 bgcolor=#E9E9E9
| 15404 ||  || — || November 6, 1997 || Xinglong || SCAP || — || align=right | 6.3 km || 
|-id=405 bgcolor=#E9E9E9
| 15405 ||  || — || November 19, 1997 || Nachi-Katsuura || Y. Shimizu, T. Urata || — || align=right | 4.8 km || 
|-id=406 bgcolor=#E9E9E9
| 15406 Bleibtreu ||  ||  || November 23, 1997 || Kitt Peak || Spacewatch || — || align=right | 5.2 km || 
|-id=407 bgcolor=#fefefe
| 15407 Udakiyoo ||  ||  || November 24, 1997 || Moriyama || Y. Ikari || — || align=right | 4.6 km || 
|-id=408 bgcolor=#d6d6d6
| 15408 ||  || — || November 30, 1997 || Oizumi || T. Kobayashi || — || align=right | 8.5 km || 
|-id=409 bgcolor=#d6d6d6
| 15409 ||  || — || November 29, 1997 || Socorro || LINEAR || KOR || align=right | 6.7 km || 
|-id=410 bgcolor=#d6d6d6
| 15410 || 1997 YZ || — || December 19, 1997 || Woomera || F. B. Zoltowski || — || align=right | 23 km || 
|-id=411 bgcolor=#fefefe
| 15411 ||  || — || December 18, 1997 || Xinglong || SCAP || V || align=right | 3.4 km || 
|-id=412 bgcolor=#d6d6d6
| 15412 Schaefer ||  ||  || January 2, 1998 || Kitt Peak || Spacewatch || THM || align=right | 11 km || 
|-id=413 bgcolor=#d6d6d6
| 15413 Beaglehole ||  ||  || January 22, 1998 || Kitt Peak || Spacewatch || — || align=right | 6.2 km || 
|-id=414 bgcolor=#d6d6d6
| 15414 Pettirossi ||  ||  || January 26, 1998 || Kitt Peak || Spacewatch || KOR || align=right | 4.2 km || 
|-id=415 bgcolor=#fefefe
| 15415 Rika ||  ||  || February 4, 1998 || Kuma Kogen || A. Nakamura || — || align=right | 2.8 km || 
|-id=416 bgcolor=#E9E9E9
| 15416 ||  || — || February 21, 1998 || Xinglong || SCAP || MAR || align=right | 8.6 km || 
|-id=417 bgcolor=#d6d6d6
| 15417 Babylon ||  ||  || February 27, 1998 || La Silla || E. W. Elst || 3:2 || align=right | 23 km || 
|-id=418 bgcolor=#E9E9E9
| 15418 Sergiospinelli ||  ||  || February 27, 1998 || Cima Ekar || G. Forti, M. Tombelli || — || align=right | 14 km || 
|-id=419 bgcolor=#E9E9E9
| 15419 ||  || — || March 20, 1998 || Socorro || LINEAR || — || align=right | 6.0 km || 
|-id=420 bgcolor=#E9E9E9
| 15420 Aedouglass ||  ||  || April 28, 1998 || Kitt Peak || Spacewatch || — || align=right | 3.9 km || 
|-id=421 bgcolor=#d6d6d6
| 15421 Adammalin ||  ||  || April 21, 1998 || Socorro || LINEAR || KOR || align=right | 4.7 km || 
|-id=422 bgcolor=#E9E9E9
| 15422 ||  || — || August 17, 1998 || Socorro || LINEAR || — || align=right | 12 km || 
|-id=423 bgcolor=#fefefe
| 15423 ||  || — || August 28, 1998 || Socorro || LINEAR || — || align=right | 2.3 km || 
|-id=424 bgcolor=#fefefe
| 15424 ||  || — || August 26, 1998 || La Silla || E. W. Elst || NYS || align=right | 3.6 km || 
|-id=425 bgcolor=#E9E9E9
| 15425 Welzl ||  ||  || September 24, 1998 || Ondřejov || P. Pravec || — || align=right | 7.2 km || 
|-id=426 bgcolor=#d6d6d6
| 15426 ||  || — || September 26, 1998 || Xinglong || SCAP || 3:2 || align=right | 14 km || 
|-id=427 bgcolor=#E9E9E9
| 15427 Shabas ||  ||  || September 17, 1998 || Anderson Mesa || LONEOS || — || align=right | 8.6 km || 
|-id=428 bgcolor=#d6d6d6
| 15428 ||  || — || September 26, 1998 || Socorro || LINEAR || — || align=right | 16 km || 
|-id=429 bgcolor=#fefefe
| 15429 ||  || — || October 30, 1998 || Višnjan Observatory || K. Korlević || NYS || align=right | 2.9 km || 
|-id=430 bgcolor=#fefefe
| 15430 ||  || — || October 22, 1998 || Xinglong || SCAP || moon || align=right | 3.7 km || 
|-id=431 bgcolor=#fefefe
| 15431 ||  || — || October 30, 1998 || Xinglong || SCAP || — || align=right | 3.3 km || 
|-id=432 bgcolor=#fefefe
| 15432 ||  || — || November 11, 1998 || Višnjan Observatory || K. Korlević || — || align=right | 3.5 km || 
|-id=433 bgcolor=#fefefe
| 15433 ||  || — || November 10, 1998 || Socorro || LINEAR || V || align=right | 3.9 km || 
|-id=434 bgcolor=#fefefe
| 15434 Mittal ||  ||  || November 10, 1998 || Socorro || LINEAR || FLO || align=right | 2.6 km || 
|-id=435 bgcolor=#fefefe
| 15435 ||  || — || November 10, 1998 || Socorro || LINEAR || — || align=right | 2.6 km || 
|-id=436 bgcolor=#C2FFFF
| 15436 Dexius ||  ||  || November 10, 1998 || Socorro || LINEAR || L4 || align=right | 88 km || 
|-id=437 bgcolor=#fefefe
| 15437 ||  || — || November 9, 1998 || Xinglong || SCAP || NYS || align=right | 2.6 km || 
|-id=438 bgcolor=#E9E9E9
| 15438 Joegotobed ||  ||  || November 17, 1998 || Catalina || CSS || BAR || align=right | 5.3 km || 
|-id=439 bgcolor=#fefefe
| 15439 ||  || — || November 18, 1998 || Oizumi || T. Kobayashi || FLO || align=right | 2.9 km || 
|-id=440 bgcolor=#C2FFFF
| 15440 Eioneus ||  ||  || November 19, 1998 || Catalina || CSS || L4 || align=right | 63 km || 
|-id=441 bgcolor=#E9E9E9
| 15441 ||  || — || November 27, 1998 || Višnjan Observatory || K. Korlević || JUN || align=right | 7.3 km || 
|-id=442 bgcolor=#C2FFFF
| 15442 ||  || — || November 21, 1998 || Socorro || LINEAR || L4 || align=right | 22 km || 
|-id=443 bgcolor=#E9E9E9
| 15443 ||  || — || November 23, 1998 || Socorro || LINEAR || — || align=right | 2.9 km || 
|-id=444 bgcolor=#d6d6d6
| 15444 ||  || — || November 25, 1998 || Socorro || LINEAR || — || align=right | 8.9 km || 
|-id=445 bgcolor=#E9E9E9
| 15445 || 1998 XE || — || December 1, 1998 || Xinglong || SCAP || ADE || align=right | 12 km || 
|-id=446 bgcolor=#fefefe
| 15446 ||  || — || December 12, 1998 || Oizumi || T. Kobayashi || — || align=right | 4.8 km || 
|-id=447 bgcolor=#E9E9E9
| 15447 ||  || — || December 12, 1998 || Oizumi || T. Kobayashi || — || align=right | 4.4 km || 
|-id=448 bgcolor=#E9E9E9
| 15448 Siegwarth ||  ||  || December 10, 1998 || Kitt Peak || Spacewatch || — || align=right | 7.6 km || 
|-id=449 bgcolor=#E9E9E9
| 15449 ||  || — || December 14, 1998 || Socorro || LINEAR || — || align=right | 4.8 km || 
|-id=450 bgcolor=#E9E9E9
| 15450 ||  || — || December 14, 1998 || Socorro || LINEAR || — || align=right | 12 km || 
|-id=451 bgcolor=#d6d6d6
| 15451 ||  || — || December 14, 1998 || Socorro || LINEAR || EOS || align=right | 11 km || 
|-id=452 bgcolor=#fefefe
| 15452 Ibramohammed ||  ||  || December 14, 1998 || Socorro || LINEAR || — || align=right | 4.9 km || 
|-id=453 bgcolor=#d6d6d6
| 15453 Brasileirinhos ||  ||  || December 12, 1998 || Mérida || O. A. Naranjo || KOR || align=right | 4.1 km || 
|-id=454 bgcolor=#d6d6d6
| 15454 ||  || — || December 17, 1998 || Oizumi || T. Kobayashi || 627 || align=right | 16 km || 
|-id=455 bgcolor=#fefefe
| 15455 ||  || — || December 17, 1998 || Oizumi || T. Kobayashi || — || align=right | 2.4 km || 
|-id=456 bgcolor=#fefefe
| 15456 ||  || — || December 18, 1998 || Kleť || Kleť Obs. || V || align=right | 2.0 km || 
|-id=457 bgcolor=#d6d6d6
| 15457 ||  || — || December 18, 1998 || Caussols || ODAS || ALA || align=right | 19 km || 
|-id=458 bgcolor=#fefefe
| 15458 ||  || — || December 25, 1998 || Višnjan Observatory || K. Korlević, M. Jurić || MAS || align=right | 3.5 km || 
|-id=459 bgcolor=#d6d6d6
| 15459 ||  || — || December 25, 1998 || Višnjan Observatory || K. Korlević, M. Jurić || — || align=right | 4.5 km || 
|-id=460 bgcolor=#d6d6d6
| 15460 Manca ||  ||  || December 25, 1998 || San Marcello || A. Boattini, L. Tesi || KOR || align=right | 5.4 km || 
|-id=461 bgcolor=#d6d6d6
| 15461 Johnbird ||  ||  || December 27, 1998 || Anderson Mesa || LONEOS || — || align=right | 6.7 km || 
|-id=462 bgcolor=#d6d6d6
| 15462 Stumegan ||  ||  || January 8, 1999 || Kitt Peak || Spacewatch || KOR || align=right | 6.0 km || 
|-id=463 bgcolor=#E9E9E9
| 15463 ||  || — || January 9, 1999 || Oizumi || T. Kobayashi || — || align=right | 10 km || 
|-id=464 bgcolor=#fefefe
| 15464 ||  || — || January 12, 1999 || Oizumi || T. Kobayashi || FLO || align=right | 3.4 km || 
|-id=465 bgcolor=#d6d6d6
| 15465 Buchroeder ||  ||  || January 15, 1999 || Kitt Peak || Spacewatch || — || align=right | 7.3 km || 
|-id=466 bgcolor=#E9E9E9
| 15466 Barlow ||  ||  || January 14, 1999 || Anderson Mesa || LONEOS || EUN || align=right | 5.8 km || 
|-id=467 bgcolor=#d6d6d6
| 15467 Aflorsch ||  ||  || January 15, 1999 || Caussols || ODAS || KOR || align=right | 5.4 km || 
|-id=468 bgcolor=#d6d6d6
| 15468 Mondriaan ||  ||  || January 14, 1999 || Kitt Peak || Spacewatch || — || align=right | 5.3 km || 
|-id=469 bgcolor=#d6d6d6
| 15469 Ohmura || 1999 BC ||  || January 16, 1999 || Oizumi || T. Kobayashi || KOR || align=right | 5.5 km || 
|-id=470 bgcolor=#fefefe
| 15470 || 1999 BS || — || January 16, 1999 || Višnjan Observatory || K. Korlević || NYS || align=right | 4.7 km || 
|-id=471 bgcolor=#E9E9E9
| 15471 ||  || — || January 19, 1999 || High Point || D. K. Chesney || — || align=right | 4.8 km || 
|-id=472 bgcolor=#d6d6d6
| 15472 ||  || — || January 20, 1999 || Višnjan Observatory || K. Korlević || THM || align=right | 8.0 km || 
|-id=473 bgcolor=#E9E9E9
| 15473 ||  || — || January 23, 1999 || Višnjan Observatory || K. Korlević || — || align=right | 7.0 km || 
|-id=474 bgcolor=#d6d6d6
| 15474 ||  || — || January 20, 1999 || Caussols || ODAS || — || align=right | 7.7 km || 
|-id=475 bgcolor=#fefefe
| 15475 ||  || — || January 24, 1999 || Woomera || F. B. Zoltowski || — || align=right | 3.0 km || 
|-id=476 bgcolor=#fefefe
| 15476 Narendra ||  ||  || January 18, 1999 || Socorro || LINEAR || V || align=right | 2.5 km || 
|-id=477 bgcolor=#d6d6d6
| 15477 ||  || — || February 6, 1999 || Oizumi || T. Kobayashi || 628 || align=right | 8.3 km || 
|-id=478 bgcolor=#d6d6d6
| 15478 ||  || — || February 7, 1999 || San Marcello || L. Tesi, A. Boattini || — || align=right | 11 km || 
|-id=479 bgcolor=#fefefe
| 15479 ||  || — || February 8, 1999 || Uenohara || N. Kawasato || — || align=right | 6.4 km || 
|-id=480 bgcolor=#d6d6d6
| 15480 ||  || — || February 12, 1999 || Uenohara || N. Kawasato || EOS || align=right | 8.7 km || 
|-id=481 bgcolor=#fefefe
| 15481 ||  || — || February 10, 1999 || Socorro || LINEAR || — || align=right | 4.7 km || 
|-id=482 bgcolor=#d6d6d6
| 15482 ||  || — || February 10, 1999 || Socorro || LINEAR || THM || align=right | 11 km || 
|-id=483 bgcolor=#d6d6d6
| 15483 ||  || — || February 10, 1999 || Socorro || LINEAR || — || align=right | 10 km || 
|-id=484 bgcolor=#d6d6d6
| 15484 ||  || — || February 10, 1999 || Socorro || LINEAR || — || align=right | 9.0 km || 
|-id=485 bgcolor=#d6d6d6
| 15485 ||  || — || February 10, 1999 || Socorro || LINEAR || THM || align=right | 10 km || 
|-id=486 bgcolor=#E9E9E9
| 15486 ||  || — || February 12, 1999 || Socorro || LINEAR || — || align=right | 4.7 km || 
|-id=487 bgcolor=#d6d6d6
| 15487 ||  || — || February 12, 1999 || Socorro || LINEAR || — || align=right | 11 km || 
|-id=488 bgcolor=#d6d6d6
| 15488 ||  || — || February 12, 1999 || Socorro || LINEAR || ALA || align=right | 18 km || 
|-id=489 bgcolor=#d6d6d6
| 15489 ||  || — || February 12, 1999 || Socorro || LINEAR || — || align=right | 15 km || 
|-id=490 bgcolor=#E9E9E9
| 15490 ||  || — || February 12, 1999 || Socorro || LINEAR || — || align=right | 4.0 km || 
|-id=491 bgcolor=#fefefe
| 15491 ||  || — || February 10, 1999 || Socorro || LINEAR || FLO || align=right | 4.9 km || 
|-id=492 bgcolor=#fefefe
| 15492 Nyberg ||  ||  || February 10, 1999 || Socorro || LINEAR || NYS || align=right | 7.3 km || 
|-id=493 bgcolor=#d6d6d6
| 15493 ||  || — || February 12, 1999 || Socorro || LINEAR || — || align=right | 9.8 km || 
|-id=494 bgcolor=#E9E9E9
| 15494 ||  || — || February 11, 1999 || Socorro || LINEAR || MAR || align=right | 11 km || 
|-id=495 bgcolor=#E9E9E9
| 15495 Bogie ||  ||  || February 17, 1999 || Reedy Creek || J. Broughton || — || align=right | 6.2 km || 
|-id=496 bgcolor=#E9E9E9
| 15496 ||  || — || February 20, 1999 || Nachi-Katsuura || Y. Shimizu, T. Urata || — || align=right | 8.6 km || 
|-id=497 bgcolor=#d6d6d6
| 15497 Lucca ||  ||  || February 23, 1999 || Monte Agliale || S. Donati || THM || align=right | 7.4 km || 
|-id=498 bgcolor=#d6d6d6
| 15498 ||  || — || March 13, 1999 || Višnjan Observatory || K. Korlević || EOS || align=right | 11 km || 
|-id=499 bgcolor=#d6d6d6
| 15499 Cloyd ||  ||  || March 19, 1999 || Anderson Mesa || LONEOS || EOS || align=right | 9.0 km || 
|-id=500 bgcolor=#fefefe
| 15500 Anantpatel ||  ||  || March 19, 1999 || Socorro || LINEAR || — || align=right | 3.3 km || 
|}

15501–15600 

|-bgcolor=#d6d6d6
| 15501 Pepawlowski ||  ||  || July 13, 1999 || Socorro || LINEAR || KOR || align=right | 4.5 km || 
|-id=502 bgcolor=#C2FFFF
| 15502 ||  || — || July 14, 1999 || Socorro || LINEAR || L5 || align=right | 53 km || 
|-id=503 bgcolor=#E9E9E9
| 15503 ||  || — || September 7, 1999 || Socorro || LINEAR || — || align=right | 9.6 km || 
|-id=504 bgcolor=#C7FF8F
| 15504 ||  || — || September 4, 1999 || Catalina || CSS || damocloidunusualcritical || align=right | 17 km || 
|-id=505 bgcolor=#d6d6d6
| 15505 ||  || — || September 7, 1999 || Socorro || LINEAR || HIL3:2 || align=right | 25 km || 
|-id=506 bgcolor=#fefefe
| 15506 Preygel ||  ||  || September 9, 1999 || Socorro || LINEAR || — || align=right | 2.3 km || 
|-id=507 bgcolor=#fefefe
| 15507 Rengarajan ||  ||  || September 9, 1999 || Socorro || LINEAR || — || align=right | 7.9 km || 
|-id=508 bgcolor=#d6d6d6
| 15508 ||  || — || October 1, 1999 || Catalina || CSS || — || align=right | 3.1 km || 
|-id=509 bgcolor=#E9E9E9
| 15509 ||  || — || October 4, 1999 || Socorro || LINEAR || — || align=right | 4.6 km || 
|-id=510 bgcolor=#fefefe
| 15510 Phoeberounds ||  ||  || October 4, 1999 || Socorro || LINEAR || — || align=right | 5.2 km || 
|-id=511 bgcolor=#E9E9E9
| 15511 ||  || — || October 12, 1999 || Socorro || LINEAR || — || align=right | 5.8 km || 
|-id=512 bgcolor=#d6d6d6
| 15512 Snyder ||  ||  || October 18, 1999 || Junk Bond || J. Medkeff, D. Healy || — || align=right | 20 km || 
|-id=513 bgcolor=#fefefe
| 15513 Emmermann ||  ||  || October 29, 1999 || Anderson Mesa || LONEOS || — || align=right | 3.6 km || 
|-id=514 bgcolor=#d6d6d6
| 15514 ||  || — || November 13, 1999 || Oizumi || T. Kobayashi || — || align=right | 25 km || 
|-id=515 bgcolor=#d6d6d6
| 15515 ||  || — || November 4, 1999 || Socorro || LINEAR || — || align=right | 10 km || 
|-id=516 bgcolor=#E9E9E9
| 15516 ||  || — || November 5, 1999 || Socorro || LINEAR || EUN || align=right | 5.0 km || 
|-id=517 bgcolor=#E9E9E9
| 15517 ||  || — || November 4, 1999 || Catalina || CSS || DOR || align=right | 9.4 km || 
|-id=518 bgcolor=#E9E9E9
| 15518 ||  || — || November 10, 1999 || Catalina || CSS || DOR || align=right | 11 km || 
|-id=519 bgcolor=#d6d6d6
| 15519 || 1999 XW || — || December 2, 1999 || Oizumi || T. Kobayashi || — || align=right | 16 km || 
|-id=520 bgcolor=#E9E9E9
| 15520 ||  || — || December 7, 1999 || Socorro || LINEAR || EUN || align=right | 8.6 km || 
|-id=521 bgcolor=#C2FFFF
| 15521 ||  || — || December 12, 1999 || Socorro || LINEAR || L4 || align=right | 28 km || 
|-id=522 bgcolor=#fefefe
| 15522 Trueblood ||  ||  || December 14, 1999 || Fountain Hills || C. W. Juels || — || align=right | 3.6 km || 
|-id=523 bgcolor=#E9E9E9
| 15523 Grenville ||  ||  || December 9, 1999 || Anderson Mesa || LONEOS || GEF || align=right | 4.9 km || 
|-id=524 bgcolor=#E9E9E9
| 15524 ||  || — || December 10, 1999 || Socorro || LINEAR || — || align=right | 7.6 km || 
|-id=525 bgcolor=#E9E9E9
| 15525 ||  || — || December 10, 1999 || Socorro || LINEAR || — || align=right | 6.8 km || 
|-id=526 bgcolor=#d6d6d6
| 15526 Kokura ||  ||  || December 8, 1999 || Anderson Mesa || LONEOS || — || align=right | 6.0 km || 
|-id=527 bgcolor=#C2FFFF
| 15527 ||  || — || December 16, 1999 || Socorro || LINEAR || L4 || align=right | 36 km || 
|-id=528 bgcolor=#fefefe
| 15528 ||  || — || January 3, 2000 || Socorro || LINEAR || FLO || align=right | 2.3 km || 
|-id=529 bgcolor=#C2FFFF
| 15529 ||  || — || January 5, 2000 || Socorro || LINEAR || L4slow || align=right | 16 km || 
|-id=530 bgcolor=#fefefe
| 15530 Kuber ||  ||  || January 5, 2000 || Socorro || LINEAR || FLO || align=right | 2.3 km || 
|-id=531 bgcolor=#fefefe
| 15531 ||  || — || January 5, 2000 || Socorro || LINEAR || — || align=right | 2.2 km || 
|-id=532 bgcolor=#d6d6d6
| 15532 ||  || — || January 5, 2000 || Socorro || LINEAR || — || align=right | 19 km || 
|-id=533 bgcolor=#fefefe
| 15533 ||  || — || January 5, 2000 || Socorro || LINEAR || slow || align=right | 3.9 km || 
|-id=534 bgcolor=#d6d6d6
| 15534 ||  || — || January 5, 2000 || Socorro || LINEAR || — || align=right | 13 km || 
|-id=535 bgcolor=#C2FFFF
| 15535 ||  || — || January 7, 2000 || Socorro || LINEAR || L4 || align=right | 40 km || 
|-id=536 bgcolor=#C2FFFF
| 15536 ||  || — || January 8, 2000 || Socorro || LINEAR || L4 || align=right | 29 km || 
|-id=537 bgcolor=#d6d6d6
| 15537 ||  || — || January 9, 2000 || Socorro || LINEAR || — || align=right | 16 km || 
|-id=538 bgcolor=#d6d6d6
| 15538 ||  || — || January 31, 2000 || Oizumi || T. Kobayashi || EOS || align=right | 7.6 km || 
|-id=539 bgcolor=#C2FFFF
| 15539 ||  || — || February 2, 2000 || Socorro || LINEAR || L4 || align=right | 42 km || 
|-id=540 bgcolor=#d6d6d6
| 15540 ||  || — || February 2, 2000 || Socorro || LINEAR || 3:2 || align=right | 20 km || 
|-id=541 bgcolor=#d6d6d6
| 15541 ||  || — || February 2, 2000 || Socorro || LINEAR || — || align=right | 13 km || 
|-id=542 bgcolor=#E9E9E9
| 15542 ||  || — || February 28, 2000 || Višnjan Observatory || K. Korlević, M. Jurić || — || align=right | 9.2 km || 
|-id=543 bgcolor=#E9E9E9
| 15543 Elizateel ||  ||  || February 29, 2000 || Socorro || LINEAR || — || align=right | 3.2 km || 
|-id=544 bgcolor=#d6d6d6
| 15544 ||  || — || March 3, 2000 || Socorro || LINEAR || KOR || align=right | 4.0 km || 
|-id=545 bgcolor=#d6d6d6
| 15545 ||  || — || March 9, 2000 || Socorro || LINEAR || SHU3:2 || align=right | 16 km || 
|-id=546 bgcolor=#E9E9E9
| 15546 ||  || — || March 5, 2000 || Socorro || LINEAR || — || align=right | 3.9 km || 
|-id=547 bgcolor=#fefefe
| 15547 ||  || — || March 9, 2000 || Socorro || LINEAR || — || align=right | 2.2 km || 
|-id=548 bgcolor=#fefefe
| 15548 Kalinowski ||  ||  || March 4, 2000 || Catalina || CSS || — || align=right | 2.6 km || 
|-id=549 bgcolor=#fefefe
| 15549 || 2000 FN || — || March 25, 2000 || Oizumi || T. Kobayashi || FLO || align=right | 4.5 km || 
|-id=550 bgcolor=#d6d6d6
| 15550 Sydney ||  ||  || March 31, 2000 || Reedy Creek || J. Broughton || EOS || align=right | 7.7 km || 
|-id=551 bgcolor=#d6d6d6
| 15551 Paddock ||  ||  || March 27, 2000 || Anderson Mesa || LONEOS || — || align=right | 6.9 km || 
|-id=552 bgcolor=#d6d6d6
| 15552 Sandashounkan ||  ||  || March 27, 2000 || Anderson Mesa || LONEOS || TIR || align=right | 7.6 km || 
|-id=553 bgcolor=#fefefe
| 15553 Carachang ||  ||  || March 29, 2000 || Socorro || LINEAR || V || align=right | 2.4 km || 
|-id=554 bgcolor=#fefefe
| 15554 ||  || — || March 29, 2000 || Socorro || LINEAR || V || align=right | 3.9 km || 
|-id=555 bgcolor=#d6d6d6
| 15555 ||  || — || March 30, 2000 || Socorro || LINEAR || EOS || align=right | 6.2 km || 
|-id=556 bgcolor=#fefefe
| 15556 ||  || — || March 30, 2000 || Socorro || LINEAR || V || align=right | 3.4 km || 
|-id=557 bgcolor=#d6d6d6
| 15557 Kimcochran || 2000 GV ||  || April 2, 2000 || Kitt Peak || Spacewatch || — || align=right | 5.0 km || 
|-id=558 bgcolor=#E9E9E9
| 15558 ||  || — || April 3, 2000 || Socorro || LINEAR || — || align=right | 6.1 km || 
|-id=559 bgcolor=#E9E9E9
| 15559 Abigailhines ||  ||  || April 5, 2000 || Socorro || LINEAR || — || align=right | 4.2 km || 
|-id=560 bgcolor=#d6d6d6
| 15560 ||  || — || April 5, 2000 || Socorro || LINEAR || — || align=right | 7.0 km || 
|-id=561 bgcolor=#fefefe
| 15561 ||  || — || April 5, 2000 || Socorro || LINEAR || KLI || align=right | 8.2 km || 
|-id=562 bgcolor=#d6d6d6
| 15562 ||  || — || April 5, 2000 || Socorro || LINEAR || — || align=right | 30 km || 
|-id=563 bgcolor=#fefefe
| 15563 Remsberg ||  ||  || April 5, 2000 || Socorro || LINEAR || NYS || align=right | 2.4 km || 
|-id=564 bgcolor=#d6d6d6
| 15564 ||  || — || April 5, 2000 || Socorro || LINEAR || KOR || align=right | 5.3 km || 
|-id=565 bgcolor=#d6d6d6
| 15565 Benjaminsteele ||  ||  || April 5, 2000 || Socorro || LINEAR || KOR || align=right | 3.7 km || 
|-id=566 bgcolor=#fefefe
| 15566 Elizabethbaker ||  ||  || April 5, 2000 || Socorro || LINEAR || — || align=right | 2.1 km || 
|-id=567 bgcolor=#d6d6d6
| 15567 Giacomelli ||  ||  || April 5, 2000 || Socorro || LINEAR || — || align=right | 6.2 km || 
|-id=568 bgcolor=#d6d6d6
| 15568 ||  || — || April 5, 2000 || Socorro || LINEAR || — || align=right | 5.4 km || 
|-id=569 bgcolor=#fefefe
| 15569 Feinberg ||  ||  || April 5, 2000 || Socorro || LINEAR || — || align=right | 2.4 km || 
|-id=570 bgcolor=#fefefe
| 15570 ||  || — || April 5, 2000 || Socorro || LINEAR || — || align=right | 8.2 km || 
|-id=571 bgcolor=#d6d6d6
| 15571 ||  || — || April 5, 2000 || Socorro || LINEAR || — || align=right | 7.8 km || 
|-id=572 bgcolor=#d6d6d6
| 15572 ||  || — || April 5, 2000 || Socorro || LINEAR || THM || align=right | 8.1 km || 
|-id=573 bgcolor=#d6d6d6
| 15573 ||  || — || April 5, 2000 || Socorro || LINEAR || KOR || align=right | 4.3 km || 
|-id=574 bgcolor=#fefefe
| 15574 Stephaniehass ||  ||  || April 5, 2000 || Socorro || LINEAR || — || align=right | 2.6 km || 
|-id=575 bgcolor=#E9E9E9
| 15575 ||  || — || April 5, 2000 || Socorro || LINEAR || MRX || align=right | 4.7 km || 
|-id=576 bgcolor=#d6d6d6
| 15576 Munday ||  ||  || April 5, 2000 || Socorro || LINEAR || KOR || align=right | 3.1 km || 
|-id=577 bgcolor=#fefefe
| 15577 Gywilliams ||  ||  || April 5, 2000 || Socorro || LINEAR || — || align=right | 1.8 km || 
|-id=578 bgcolor=#d6d6d6
| 15578 ||  || — || April 5, 2000 || Socorro || LINEAR || KOR || align=right | 5.8 km || 
|-id=579 bgcolor=#E9E9E9
| 15579 ||  || — || April 5, 2000 || Socorro || LINEAR || — || align=right | 6.3 km || 
|-id=580 bgcolor=#E9E9E9
| 15580 ||  || — || April 5, 2000 || Socorro || LINEAR || — || align=right | 11 km || 
|-id=581 bgcolor=#E9E9E9
| 15581 ||  || — || April 5, 2000 || Socorro || LINEAR || — || align=right | 4.3 km || 
|-id=582 bgcolor=#d6d6d6
| 15582 Russellburrows ||  ||  || April 5, 2000 || Socorro || LINEAR || — || align=right | 6.5 km || 
|-id=583 bgcolor=#E9E9E9
| 15583 Hanick ||  ||  || April 5, 2000 || Socorro || LINEAR || — || align=right | 4.3 km || 
|-id=584 bgcolor=#d6d6d6
| 15584 ||  || — || April 5, 2000 || Socorro || LINEAR || — || align=right | 9.2 km || 
|-id=585 bgcolor=#fefefe
| 15585 ||  || — || April 5, 2000 || Socorro || LINEAR || — || align=right | 3.8 km || 
|-id=586 bgcolor=#E9E9E9
| 15586 ||  || — || April 5, 2000 || Socorro || LINEAR || — || align=right | 7.6 km || 
|-id=587 bgcolor=#d6d6d6
| 15587 ||  || — || April 5, 2000 || Socorro || LINEAR || — || align=right | 3.6 km || 
|-id=588 bgcolor=#d6d6d6
| 15588 ||  || — || April 5, 2000 || Socorro || LINEAR || THM || align=right | 8.4 km || 
|-id=589 bgcolor=#d6d6d6
| 15589 ||  || — || April 6, 2000 || Socorro || LINEAR || EOS || align=right | 9.1 km || 
|-id=590 bgcolor=#E9E9E9
| 15590 ||  || — || April 7, 2000 || Višnjan Observatory || K. Korlević || — || align=right | 7.3 km || 
|-id=591 bgcolor=#d6d6d6
| 15591 ||  || — || April 4, 2000 || Socorro || LINEAR || — || align=right | 7.7 km || 
|-id=592 bgcolor=#E9E9E9
| 15592 ||  || — || April 4, 2000 || Socorro || LINEAR || — || align=right | 6.7 km || 
|-id=593 bgcolor=#d6d6d6
| 15593 ||  || — || April 5, 2000 || Socorro || LINEAR || — || align=right | 8.7 km || 
|-id=594 bgcolor=#fefefe
| 15594 Castillo ||  ||  || April 6, 2000 || Socorro || LINEAR || — || align=right | 4.0 km || 
|-id=595 bgcolor=#E9E9E9
| 15595 ||  || — || April 6, 2000 || Socorro || LINEAR || — || align=right | 4.2 km || 
|-id=596 bgcolor=#fefefe
| 15596 ||  || — || April 6, 2000 || Socorro || LINEAR || NYS || align=right | 5.0 km || 
|-id=597 bgcolor=#d6d6d6
| 15597 ||  || — || April 6, 2000 || Socorro || LINEAR || KOR || align=right | 5.6 km || 
|-id=598 bgcolor=#E9E9E9
| 15598 ||  || — || April 6, 2000 || Socorro || LINEAR || — || align=right | 7.5 km || 
|-id=599 bgcolor=#fefefe
| 15599 Richardlarson ||  ||  || April 7, 2000 || Socorro || LINEAR || — || align=right | 3.2 km || 
|-id=600 bgcolor=#d6d6d6
| 15600 ||  || — || April 7, 2000 || Socorro || LINEAR || EOS || align=right | 8.3 km || 
|}

15601–15700 

|-bgcolor=#d6d6d6
| 15601 ||  || — || April 7, 2000 || Socorro || LINEAR || — || align=right | 12 km || 
|-id=602 bgcolor=#E9E9E9
| 15602 ||  || — || April 7, 2000 || Socorro || LINEAR || HOF || align=right | 13 km || 
|-id=603 bgcolor=#E9E9E9
| 15603 ||  || — || April 7, 2000 || Socorro || LINEAR || — || align=right | 6.4 km || 
|-id=604 bgcolor=#fefefe
| 15604 Fruits ||  ||  || April 7, 2000 || Socorro || LINEAR || — || align=right | 3.3 km || 
|-id=605 bgcolor=#E9E9E9
| 15605 ||  || — || April 7, 2000 || Socorro || LINEAR || EUN || align=right | 7.2 km || 
|-id=606 bgcolor=#fefefe
| 15606 Winer ||  ||  || April 11, 2000 || Fountain Hills || C. W. Juels || FLO || align=right | 3.8 km || 
|-id=607 bgcolor=#fefefe
| 15607 ||  || — || April 7, 2000 || Socorro || LINEAR || — || align=right | 8.7 km || 
|-id=608 bgcolor=#fefefe
| 15608 Owens ||  ||  || April 7, 2000 || Socorro || LINEAR || V || align=right | 2.7 km || 
|-id=609 bgcolor=#FA8072
| 15609 Kosmaczewski ||  ||  || April 7, 2000 || Socorro || LINEAR || — || align=right | 4.7 km || 
|-id=610 bgcolor=#d6d6d6
| 15610 ||  || — || April 7, 2000 || Socorro || LINEAR || 629 || align=right | 5.8 km || 
|-id=611 bgcolor=#E9E9E9
| 15611 ||  || — || April 7, 2000 || Socorro || LINEAR || — || align=right | 11 km || 
|-id=612 bgcolor=#d6d6d6
| 15612 ||  || — || April 7, 2000 || Socorro || LINEAR || — || align=right | 5.3 km || 
|-id=613 bgcolor=#E9E9E9
| 15613 ||  || — || April 12, 2000 || Socorro || LINEAR || — || align=right | 6.0 km || 
|-id=614 bgcolor=#d6d6d6
| 15614 Pillinger ||  ||  || April 7, 2000 || Anderson Mesa || LONEOS || EOS || align=right | 7.0 km || 
|-id=615 bgcolor=#d6d6d6
| 15615 ||  || — || April 25, 2000 || Višnjan Observatory || K. Korlević || SHU3:2 || align=right | 22 km || 
|-id=616 bgcolor=#d6d6d6
| 15616 ||  || — || April 27, 2000 || Socorro || LINEAR || — || align=right | 10 km || 
|-id=617 bgcolor=#fefefe
| 15617 Fallowfield ||  ||  || April 27, 2000 || Socorro || LINEAR || — || align=right | 2.8 km || 
|-id=618 bgcolor=#fefefe
| 15618 Lorifritz ||  ||  || April 27, 2000 || Socorro || LINEAR || — || align=right | 1.6 km || 
|-id=619 bgcolor=#E9E9E9
| 15619 Albertwu ||  ||  || April 28, 2000 || Socorro || LINEAR || — || align=right | 5.1 km || 
|-id=620 bgcolor=#fefefe
| 15620 Beltrami ||  ||  || April 29, 2000 || Prescott || P. G. Comba || NYS || align=right | 2.2 km || 
|-id=621 bgcolor=#E9E9E9
| 15621 Erikhovland ||  ||  || April 29, 2000 || Haleakala || NEAT || — || align=right | 10 km || 
|-id=622 bgcolor=#fefefe
| 15622 Westrich ||  ||  || April 27, 2000 || Socorro || LINEAR || — || align=right | 2.4 km || 
|-id=623 bgcolor=#fefefe
| 15623 ||  || — || April 28, 2000 || Socorro || LINEAR || NYS || align=right | 3.4 km || 
|-id=624 bgcolor=#fefefe
| 15624 Lamberton ||  ||  || April 28, 2000 || Socorro || LINEAR || — || align=right | 3.6 km || 
|-id=625 bgcolor=#E9E9E9
| 15625 ||  || — || April 27, 2000 || Socorro || LINEAR || MAR || align=right | 3.7 km || 
|-id=626 bgcolor=#d6d6d6
| 15626 ||  || — || April 29, 2000 || Socorro || LINEAR || 3:2 || align=right | 19 km || 
|-id=627 bgcolor=#E9E9E9
| 15627 Hong ||  ||  || April 29, 2000 || Socorro || LINEAR || — || align=right | 3.9 km || 
|-id=628 bgcolor=#fefefe
| 15628 Gonzales ||  ||  || April 29, 2000 || Socorro || LINEAR || — || align=right | 2.3 km || 
|-id=629 bgcolor=#E9E9E9
| 15629 Sriner ||  ||  || April 29, 2000 || Socorro || LINEAR || — || align=right | 6.0 km || 
|-id=630 bgcolor=#fefefe
| 15630 Disanti ||  ||  || April 24, 2000 || Anderson Mesa || LONEOS || — || align=right | 3.5 km || 
|-id=631 bgcolor=#d6d6d6
| 15631 Dellorusso ||  ||  || April 24, 2000 || Anderson Mesa || LONEOS || EOS || align=right | 9.3 km || 
|-id=632 bgcolor=#fefefe
| 15632 Magee-Sauer ||  ||  || April 26, 2000 || Anderson Mesa || LONEOS || FLO || align=right | 2.8 km || 
|-id=633 bgcolor=#fefefe
| 15633 ||  || — || May 2, 2000 || Socorro || LINEAR || PHO || align=right | 4.5 km || 
|-id=634 bgcolor=#fefefe
| 15634 ||  || — || May 6, 2000 || Socorro || LINEAR || V || align=right | 4.5 km || 
|-id=635 bgcolor=#fefefe
| 15635 Andrewhager ||  ||  || May 7, 2000 || Socorro || LINEAR || — || align=right | 8.1 km || 
|-id=636 bgcolor=#d6d6d6
| 15636 ||  || — || May 7, 2000 || Socorro || LINEAR || — || align=right | 15 km || 
|-id=637 bgcolor=#d6d6d6
| 15637 ||  || — || May 6, 2000 || Socorro || LINEAR || URS || align=right | 18 km || 
|-id=638 bgcolor=#d6d6d6
| 15638 ||  || — || May 5, 2000 || Socorro || LINEAR || HIL3:2 || align=right | 32 km || 
|-id=639 bgcolor=#fefefe
| 15639 || 2074 P-L || — || September 24, 1960 || Palomar || PLS || — || align=right | 2.1 km || 
|-id=640 bgcolor=#d6d6d6
| 15640 || 2632 P-L || — || September 24, 1960 || Palomar || PLS || — || align=right | 6.9 km || 
|-id=641 bgcolor=#fefefe
| 15641 || 2668 P-L || — || September 24, 1960 || Palomar || PLS || — || align=right | 2.9 km || 
|-id=642 bgcolor=#fefefe
| 15642 || 2679 P-L || — || September 24, 1960 || Palomar || PLS || — || align=right | 1.8 km || 
|-id=643 bgcolor=#E9E9E9
| 15643 || 3540 P-L || — || October 17, 1960 || Palomar || PLS || GEF || align=right | 5.5 km || 
|-id=644 bgcolor=#fefefe
| 15644 || 4157 P-L || — || September 24, 1960 || Palomar || PLS || — || align=right | 5.4 km || 
|-id=645 bgcolor=#d6d6d6
| 15645 || 4163 P-L || — || September 24, 1960 || Palomar || PLS || — || align=right | 4.0 km || 
|-id=646 bgcolor=#fefefe
| 15646 || 4555 P-L || — || September 24, 1960 || Palomar || PLS || NYS || align=right | 2.2 km || 
|-id=647 bgcolor=#d6d6d6
| 15647 || 4556 P-L || — || September 24, 1960 || Palomar || PLS || — || align=right | 4.8 km || 
|-id=648 bgcolor=#fefefe
| 15648 || 6115 P-L || — || September 24, 1960 || Palomar || PLS || — || align=right | 2.2 km || 
|-id=649 bgcolor=#d6d6d6
| 15649 || 6317 P-L || — || September 24, 1960 || Palomar || PLS || KAR || align=right | 3.9 km || 
|-id=650 bgcolor=#d6d6d6
| 15650 || 6725 P-L || — || September 24, 1960 || Palomar || PLS || — || align=right | 7.5 km || 
|-id=651 bgcolor=#C2FFFF
| 15651 Tlepolemos || 9612 P-L ||  || October 22, 1960 || Palomar || PLS || L4 || align=right | 24 km || 
|-id=652 bgcolor=#d6d6d6
| 15652 || 1048 T-1 || — || March 25, 1971 || Palomar || PLS || ALA || align=right | 16 km || 
|-id=653 bgcolor=#E9E9E9
| 15653 || 1080 T-1 || — || March 25, 1971 || Palomar || PLS || — || align=right | 3.5 km || 
|-id=654 bgcolor=#d6d6d6
| 15654 || 1176 T-1 || — || March 25, 1971 || Palomar || PLS || — || align=right | 13 km || 
|-id=655 bgcolor=#d6d6d6
| 15655 || 2209 T-1 || — || March 25, 1971 || Palomar || PLS || — || align=right | 9.9 km || 
|-id=656 bgcolor=#d6d6d6
| 15656 || 3277 T-1 || — || March 26, 1971 || Palomar || PLS || THM || align=right | 10 km || 
|-id=657 bgcolor=#d6d6d6
| 15657 || 1125 T-2 || — || September 29, 1973 || Palomar || PLS || THM || align=right | 5.6 km || 
|-id=658 bgcolor=#E9E9E9
| 15658 || 1265 T-2 || — || September 29, 1973 || Palomar || PLS || slow || align=right | 2.8 km || 
|-id=659 bgcolor=#E9E9E9
| 15659 || 2141 T-2 || — || September 29, 1973 || Palomar || PLS || slow || align=right | 13 km || 
|-id=660 bgcolor=#fefefe
| 15660 || 3025 T-2 || — || September 30, 1973 || Palomar || PLS || — || align=right | 2.5 km || 
|-id=661 bgcolor=#fefefe
| 15661 || 3281 T-2 || — || September 30, 1973 || Palomar || PLS || FLO || align=right | 2.3 km || 
|-id=662 bgcolor=#fefefe
| 15662 || 4064 T-2 || — || September 29, 1973 || Palomar || PLS || — || align=right | 2.4 km || 
|-id=663 bgcolor=#C2FFFF
| 15663 Periphas || 4168 T-2 ||  || September 29, 1973 || Palomar || PLS || L4 || align=right | 36 km || 
|-id=664 bgcolor=#E9E9E9
| 15664 || 4050 T-3 || — || October 16, 1977 || Palomar || PLS || — || align=right | 3.5 km || 
|-id=665 bgcolor=#E9E9E9
| 15665 || 4094 T-3 || — || October 16, 1977 || Palomar || PLS || — || align=right | 3.3 km || 
|-id=666 bgcolor=#E9E9E9
| 15666 || 5021 T-3 || — || October 16, 1977 || Palomar || PLS || KON || align=right | 4.9 km || 
|-id=667 bgcolor=#fefefe
| 15667 || 5046 T-3 || — || October 16, 1977 || Palomar || PLS || FLO || align=right | 2.2 km || 
|-id=668 bgcolor=#E9E9E9
| 15668 || 5138 T-3 || — || October 16, 1977 || Palomar || PLS || — || align=right | 3.8 km || 
|-id=669 bgcolor=#fefefe
| 15669 Pshenichner ||  ||  || September 19, 1974 || Nauchnij || L. I. Chernykh || NYS || align=right | 3.3 km || 
|-id=670 bgcolor=#d6d6d6
| 15670 ||  || — || September 30, 1975 || Palomar || S. J. Bus || — || align=right | 9.5 km || 
|-id=671 bgcolor=#d6d6d6
| 15671 Suzannedébarbat ||  ||  || March 12, 1977 || Kiso || H. Kosai, K. Furukawa || 3:2 || align=right | 17 km || 
|-id=672 bgcolor=#fefefe
| 15672 Sato-Norio ||  ||  || March 12, 1977 || Kiso || H. Kosai, K. Furukawa || NYS || align=right | 2.6 km || 
|-id=673 bgcolor=#FA8072
| 15673 Chetaev ||  ||  || August 8, 1978 || Nauchnij || N. S. Chernykh || — || align=right | 3.0 km || 
|-id=674 bgcolor=#fefefe
| 15674 Elfving ||  ||  || September 2, 1978 || La Silla || C.-I. Lagerkvist || V || align=right | 2.5 km || 
|-id=675 bgcolor=#E9E9E9
| 15675 Goloseevo ||  ||  || September 27, 1978 || Nauchnij || L. I. Chernykh || AGN || align=right | 12 km || 
|-id=676 bgcolor=#d6d6d6
| 15676 Almoisheev ||  ||  || October 8, 1978 || Nauchnij || L. I. Chernykh || — || align=right | 13 km || 
|-id=677 bgcolor=#d6d6d6
| 15677 ||  || — || October 14, 1980 || Nanking || Purple Mountain Obs. || — || align=right | 10 km || 
|-id=678 bgcolor=#fefefe
| 15678 || 1981 DM || — || February 28, 1981 || Siding Spring || S. J. Bus || — || align=right | 3.5 km || 
|-id=679 bgcolor=#E9E9E9
| 15679 ||  || — || February 28, 1981 || Siding Spring || S. J. Bus || — || align=right | 9.5 km || 
|-id=680 bgcolor=#E9E9E9
| 15680 ||  || — || March 1, 1981 || Siding Spring || S. J. Bus || PAD || align=right | 6.5 km || 
|-id=681 bgcolor=#E9E9E9
| 15681 ||  || — || March 2, 1981 || Siding Spring || S. J. Bus || HEN || align=right | 3.7 km || 
|-id=682 bgcolor=#d6d6d6
| 15682 ||  || — || March 2, 1981 || Siding Spring || S. J. Bus || — || align=right | 6.6 km || 
|-id=683 bgcolor=#fefefe
| 15683 ||  || — || March 2, 1981 || Siding Spring || S. J. Bus || — || align=right | 3.0 km || 
|-id=684 bgcolor=#E9E9E9
| 15684 ||  || — || March 2, 1981 || Siding Spring || S. J. Bus || — || align=right | 7.2 km || 
|-id=685 bgcolor=#fefefe
| 15685 ||  || — || March 1, 1981 || Siding Spring || S. J. Bus || V || align=right | 2.1 km || 
|-id=686 bgcolor=#E9E9E9
| 15686 ||  || — || March 1, 1981 || Siding Spring || S. J. Bus || — || align=right | 4.3 km || 
|-id=687 bgcolor=#fefefe
| 15687 ||  || — || March 1, 1981 || Siding Spring || S. J. Bus || V || align=right | 2.3 km || 
|-id=688 bgcolor=#E9E9E9
| 15688 ||  || — || October 24, 1981 || Palomar || S. J. Bus || EUN || align=right | 7.5 km || 
|-id=689 bgcolor=#E9E9E9
| 15689 ||  || — || October 25, 1981 || Palomar || S. J. Bus || — || align=right | 6.6 km || 
|-id=690 bgcolor=#fefefe
| 15690 ||  || — || May 15, 1982 || Palomar || Palomar Obs. || V || align=right | 3.0 km || 
|-id=691 bgcolor=#fefefe
| 15691 Maslov ||  ||  || October 14, 1982 || Nauchnij || L. G. Karachkina || — || align=right | 3.8 km || 
|-id=692 bgcolor=#fefefe
| 15692 || 1984 RA || — || September 1, 1984 || Palomar || M. A. Barucci || H || align=right | 1.7 km || 
|-id=693 bgcolor=#E9E9E9
| 15693 ||  || — || September 23, 1984 || La Silla || H. Debehogne || — || align=right | 7.7 km || 
|-id=694 bgcolor=#d6d6d6
| 15694 ||  || — || September 7, 1985 || La Silla || H. Debehogne || EOS || align=right | 8.0 km || 
|-id=695 bgcolor=#fefefe
| 15695 Fedorshpig ||  ||  || September 11, 1985 || Nauchnij || N. S. Chernykh || — || align=right | 3.8 km || 
|-id=696 bgcolor=#fefefe
| 15696 ||  || — || August 26, 1986 || La Silla || H. Debehogne || — || align=right | 3.0 km || 
|-id=697 bgcolor=#d6d6d6
| 15697 ||  || — || August 27, 1986 || La Silla || H. Debehogne || — || align=right | 4.9 km || 
|-id=698 bgcolor=#d6d6d6
| 15698 ||  || — || August 28, 1986 || La Silla || H. Debehogne || THM || align=right | 11 km || 
|-id=699 bgcolor=#fefefe
| 15699 Lyytinen ||  ||  || November 6, 1986 || Anderson Mesa || E. Bowell || — || align=right | 2.8 km || 
|-id=700 bgcolor=#FA8072
| 15700 || 1987 QD || — || August 24, 1987 || Palomar || S. Singer-Brewster || moon || align=right | 3.3 km || 
|}

15701–15800 

|-bgcolor=#fefefe
| 15701 ||  || — || September 13, 1987 || La Silla || H. Debehogne || MASslow || align=right | 8.0 km || 
|-id=702 bgcolor=#E9E9E9
| 15702 Olegkotov ||  ||  || September 2, 1987 || Nauchnij || L. I. Chernykh || GEF || align=right | 7.6 km || 
|-id=703 bgcolor=#fefefe
| 15703 Yrjölä ||  ||  || September 21, 1987 || Anderson Mesa || E. Bowell || — || align=right | 2.8 km || 
|-id=704 bgcolor=#fefefe
| 15704 ||  || — || September 20, 1987 || Palomar || J. Alu, E. F. Helin || FLO || align=right | 3.0 km || 
|-id=705 bgcolor=#fefefe
| 15705 Hautot ||  ||  || January 14, 1988 || La Silla || H. Debehogne || — || align=right | 4.8 km || 
|-id=706 bgcolor=#fefefe
| 15706 ||  || — || February 11, 1988 || La Silla || E. W. Elst || V || align=right | 3.1 km || 
|-id=707 bgcolor=#E9E9E9
| 15707 ||  || — || September 1, 1988 || La Silla || H. Debehogne || — || align=right | 11 km || 
|-id=708 bgcolor=#E9E9E9
| 15708 ||  || — || September 14, 1988 || Cerro Tololo || S. J. Bus || — || align=right | 5.1 km || 
|-id=709 bgcolor=#E9E9E9
| 15709 ||  || — || December 7, 1988 || Kushiro || S. Ueda, H. Kaneda || EUN || align=right | 8.2 km || 
|-id=710 bgcolor=#fefefe
| 15710 Böcklin ||  ||  || January 11, 1989 || Tautenburg Observatory || F. Börngen || FLO || align=right | 4.8 km || 
|-id=711 bgcolor=#fefefe
| 15711 ||  || — || April 3, 1989 || La Silla || E. W. Elst || — || align=right | 2.5 km || 
|-id=712 bgcolor=#d6d6d6
| 15712 ||  || — || September 1, 1989 || Lake Tekapo || A. C. Gilmore, P. M. Kilmartin || — || align=right | 17 km || 
|-id=713 bgcolor=#d6d6d6
| 15713 ||  || — || September 26, 1989 || La Silla || E. W. Elst || — || align=right | 8.1 km || 
|-id=714 bgcolor=#E9E9E9
| 15714 ||  || — || October 3, 1989 || La Silla || H. Debehogne || — || align=right | 4.0 km || 
|-id=715 bgcolor=#E9E9E9
| 15715 ||  || — || October 28, 1989 || Kani || Y. Mizuno, T. Furuta || — || align=right | 3.3 km || 
|-id=716 bgcolor=#E9E9E9
| 15716 Narahara ||  ||  || November 29, 1989 || Kitami || A. Takahashi, K. Watanabe || — || align=right | 5.7 km || 
|-id=717 bgcolor=#E9E9E9
| 15717 ||  || — || January 21, 1990 || Palomar || E. F. Helin || EUN || align=right | 7.0 km || 
|-id=718 bgcolor=#E9E9E9
| 15718 Imokawa ||  ||  || January 30, 1990 || Kushiro || M. Matsuyama, K. Watanabe || — || align=right | 5.5 km || 
|-id=719 bgcolor=#E9E9E9
| 15719 || 1990 CF || — || February 1, 1990 || Dynic || A. Sugie || EUN || align=right | 6.5 km || 
|-id=720 bgcolor=#E9E9E9
| 15720 ||  || — || March 2, 1990 || La Silla || E. W. Elst || — || align=right | 11 km || 
|-id=721 bgcolor=#fefefe
| 15721 || 1990 OV || — || July 19, 1990 || Palomar || E. F. Helin || V || align=right | 2.7 km || 
|-id=722 bgcolor=#d6d6d6
| 15722 ||  || — || August 24, 1990 || Palomar || H. E. Holt || EOS || align=right | 7.9 km || 
|-id=723 bgcolor=#fefefe
| 15723 Girraween ||  ||  || September 20, 1990 || Geisei || T. Seki || — || align=right | 4.1 km || 
|-id=724 bgcolor=#fefefe
| 15724 Zille ||  ||  || October 12, 1990 || Tautenburg Observatory || F. Börngen, L. D. Schmadel || V || align=right | 3.7 km || 
|-id=725 bgcolor=#d6d6d6
| 15725 ||  || — || October 9, 1990 || Siding Spring || R. H. McNaught || — || align=right | 12 km || 
|-id=726 bgcolor=#fefefe
| 15726 ||  || — || October 9, 1990 || Siding Spring || R. H. McNaught || FLO || align=right | 3.2 km || 
|-id=727 bgcolor=#fefefe
| 15727 Ianmorison ||  ||  || October 10, 1990 || Tautenburg Observatory || L. D. Schmadel, F. Börngen || FLO || align=right | 2.3 km || 
|-id=728 bgcolor=#fefefe
| 15728 Karlmay ||  ||  || October 11, 1990 || Tautenburg Observatory || F. Börngen, L. D. Schmadel || — || align=right | 2.1 km || 
|-id=729 bgcolor=#fefefe
| 15729 Yumikoitahana || 1990 UB ||  || October 16, 1990 || Kitami || A. Takahashi, K. Watanabe || — || align=right | 6.2 km || 
|-id=730 bgcolor=#E9E9E9
| 15730 ||  || — || October 20, 1990 || Dynic || A. Sugie || EUN || align=right | 8.4 km || 
|-id=731 bgcolor=#d6d6d6
| 15731 ||  || — || October 16, 1990 || Harvard Observatory || Oak Ridge Observatory || HYG || align=right | 12 km || 
|-id=732 bgcolor=#d6d6d6
| 15732 Vitusbering ||  ||  || November 15, 1990 || La Silla || E. W. Elst || VER || align=right | 15 km || 
|-id=733 bgcolor=#fefefe
| 15733 ||  || — || November 15, 1990 || La Silla || E. W. Elst || V || align=right | 3.6 km || 
|-id=734 bgcolor=#fefefe
| 15734 ||  || — || November 18, 1990 || La Silla || E. W. Elst || — || align=right | 2.4 km || 
|-id=735 bgcolor=#d6d6d6
| 15735 Andakerkhoven ||  ||  || November 18, 1990 || La Silla || E. W. Elst || — || align=right | 12 km || 
|-id=736 bgcolor=#fefefe
| 15736 Hamanasu || 1990 XN ||  || December 8, 1990 || Kitami || K. Endate, K. Watanabe || — || align=right | 7.8 km || 
|-id=737 bgcolor=#E9E9E9
| 15737 || 1991 CL || — || February 5, 1991 || Yorii || M. Arai, H. Mori || — || align=right | 7.9 km || 
|-id=738 bgcolor=#d6d6d6
| 15738 || 1991 DP || — || February 21, 1991 || Karasuyama || S. Inoda, T. Urata || EOS || align=right | 8.8 km || 
|-id=739 bgcolor=#E9E9E9
| 15739 Matsukuma || 1991 ER ||  || March 9, 1991 || Geisei || T. Seki || — || align=right | 5.1 km || 
|-id=740 bgcolor=#E9E9E9
| 15740 Hyakumangoku ||  ||  || March 15, 1991 || Kitami || K. Endate, K. Watanabe || — || align=right | 6.0 km || 
|-id=741 bgcolor=#fefefe
| 15741 ||  || — || April 8, 1991 || La Silla || E. W. Elst || — || align=right | 2.6 km || 
|-id=742 bgcolor=#E9E9E9
| 15742 Laurabassi ||  ||  || June 6, 1991 || La Silla || E. W. Elst || — || align=right | 4.9 km || 
|-id=743 bgcolor=#E9E9E9
| 15743 ||  || — || July 12, 1991 || La Silla || H. Debehogne || — || align=right | 8.4 km || 
|-id=744 bgcolor=#E9E9E9
| 15744 || 1991 PU || — || August 5, 1991 || Palomar || H. E. Holt || NEM || align=right | 9.9 km || 
|-id=745 bgcolor=#FFC2E0
| 15745 Yuliya ||  ||  || August 3, 1991 || La Silla || E. W. Elst || AMO +1kmmoon || align=right | 1.2 km || 
|-id=746 bgcolor=#E9E9E9
| 15746 ||  || — || August 5, 1991 || Palomar || H. E. Holt || — || align=right | 6.5 km || 
|-id=747 bgcolor=#E9E9E9
| 15747 ||  || — || September 11, 1991 || Palomar || H. E. Holt || HOF || align=right | 12 km || 
|-id=748 bgcolor=#E9E9E9
| 15748 ||  || — || September 11, 1991 || Palomar || H. E. Holt || DOR || align=right | 15 km || 
|-id=749 bgcolor=#fefefe
| 15749 ||  || — || November 5, 1991 || Ojima || A. Natori, T. Urata || FLO || align=right | 4.4 km || 
|-id=750 bgcolor=#fefefe
| 15750 ||  || — || November 9, 1991 || Dynic || A. Sugie || V || align=right | 6.2 km || 
|-id=751 bgcolor=#d6d6d6
| 15751 ||  || — || November 10, 1991 || Kiyosato || S. Otomo || EOS || align=right | 13 km || 
|-id=752 bgcolor=#d6d6d6
| 15752 Eluard ||  ||  || January 30, 1992 || La Silla || E. W. Elst || LIX || align=right | 15 km || 
|-id=753 bgcolor=#d6d6d6
| 15753 ||  || — || February 29, 1992 || La Silla || UESAC || HYG || align=right | 10 km || 
|-id=754 bgcolor=#fefefe
| 15754 || 1992 EP || — || March 7, 1992 || Kushiro || S. Ueda, H. Kaneda || ERI || align=right | 9.2 km || 
|-id=755 bgcolor=#d6d6d6
| 15755 ||  || — || March 2, 1992 || La Silla || UESAC || HYG || align=right | 8.4 km || 
|-id=756 bgcolor=#fefefe
| 15756 ||  || — || March 2, 1992 || La Silla || UESAC || V || align=right | 3.2 km || 
|-id=757 bgcolor=#fefefe
| 15757 ||  || — || March 2, 1992 || La Silla || UESAC || — || align=right | 3.1 km || 
|-id=758 bgcolor=#fefefe
| 15758 ||  || — || March 30, 1992 || Kiyosato || S. Otomo || ERI || align=right | 9.4 km || 
|-id=759 bgcolor=#fefefe
| 15759 ||  || — || April 4, 1992 || La Silla || E. W. Elst || V || align=right | 3.6 km || 
|-id=760 bgcolor=#C2E0FF
| 15760 Albion ||  ||  || August 30, 1992 || Mauna Kea || D. C. Jewitt, J. X. Luu || cubewano (cold) || align=right | 154 km || 
|-id=761 bgcolor=#E9E9E9
| 15761 Schumi ||  ||  || September 24, 1992 || Tautenburg Observatory || L. D. Schmadel, F. Börngen || — || align=right | 9.3 km || 
|-id=762 bgcolor=#E9E9E9
| 15762 Rühmann ||  ||  || September 21, 1992 || Tautenburg Observatory || F. Börngen || — || align=right | 4.1 km || 
|-id=763 bgcolor=#E9E9E9
| 15763 Nagakubo ||  ||  || October 26, 1992 || Kitami || K. Endate, K. Watanabe || — || align=right | 12 km || 
|-id=764 bgcolor=#E9E9E9
| 15764 ||  || — || October 31, 1992 || Yatsugatake || Y. Kushida, O. Muramatsu || — || align=right | 5.7 km || 
|-id=765 bgcolor=#E9E9E9
| 15765 ||  || — || November 18, 1992 || Dynic || A. Sugie || — || align=right | 3.3 km || 
|-id=766 bgcolor=#d6d6d6
| 15766 Strahlenberg ||  ||  || January 22, 1993 || La Silla || E. W. Elst || — || align=right | 14 km || 
|-id=767 bgcolor=#d6d6d6
| 15767 ||  || — || March 17, 1993 || La Silla || UESAC || — || align=right | 12 km || 
|-id=768 bgcolor=#fefefe
| 15768 ||  || — || March 17, 1993 || La Silla || UESAC || — || align=right | 3.9 km || 
|-id=769 bgcolor=#fefefe
| 15769 ||  || — || March 21, 1993 || La Silla || UESAC || NYS || align=right | 5.7 km || 
|-id=770 bgcolor=#d6d6d6
| 15770 ||  || — || March 21, 1993 || La Silla || UESAC || HYG || align=right | 8.7 km || 
|-id=771 bgcolor=#d6d6d6
| 15771 ||  || — || March 19, 1993 || La Silla || UESAC || THM || align=right | 10 km || 
|-id=772 bgcolor=#d6d6d6
| 15772 ||  || — || March 19, 1993 || La Silla || UESAC || — || align=right | 8.8 km || 
|-id=773 bgcolor=#E9E9E9
| 15773 ||  || — || March 19, 1993 || La Silla || UESAC || — || align=right | 7.4 km || 
|-id=774 bgcolor=#d6d6d6
| 15774 ||  || — || March 19, 1993 || La Silla || UESAC || — || align=right | 7.2 km || 
|-id=775 bgcolor=#fefefe
| 15775 ||  || — || March 19, 1993 || La Silla || UESAC || — || align=right | 2.8 km || 
|-id=776 bgcolor=#fefefe
| 15776 || 1993 KO || — || May 20, 1993 || Kiyosato || S. Otomo || FLO || align=right | 4.5 km || 
|-id=777 bgcolor=#E9E9E9
| 15777 || 1993 LF || — || June 14, 1993 || Palomar || H. E. Holt || MAR || align=right | 9.9 km || 
|-id=778 bgcolor=#FA8072
| 15778 || 1993 NH || — || July 15, 1993 || Palomar || E. F. Helin || slow || align=right | 2.9 km || 
|-id=779 bgcolor=#fefefe
| 15779 Scottroberts ||  ||  || July 26, 1993 || Palomar || C. S. Shoemaker, D. H. Levy || PHO || align=right | 5.7 km || 
|-id=780 bgcolor=#fefefe
| 15780 ||  || — || July 20, 1993 || La Silla || E. W. Elst || NYS || align=right | 2.1 km || 
|-id=781 bgcolor=#fefefe
| 15781 ||  || — || July 20, 1993 || La Silla || E. W. Elst || V || align=right | 3.2 km || 
|-id=782 bgcolor=#fefefe
| 15782 ||  || — || July 20, 1993 || La Silla || E. W. Elst || — || align=right | 2.5 km || 
|-id=783 bgcolor=#d6d6d6
| 15783 Briancox ||  ||  || August 14, 1993 || Caussols || E. W. Elst || 3:2 || align=right | 19 km || 
|-id=784 bgcolor=#fefefe
| 15784 || 1993 QZ || — || August 20, 1993 || Palomar || E. F. Helin || — || align=right | 4.2 km || 
|-id=785 bgcolor=#d6d6d6
| 15785 de Villegas ||  ||  || August 18, 1993 || Caussols || E. W. Elst || — || align=right | 13 km || 
|-id=786 bgcolor=#fefefe
| 15786 Hoshioka || 1993 RS ||  || September 15, 1993 || Kitami || K. Endate, K. Watanabe || H || align=right | 3.8 km || 
|-id=787 bgcolor=#fefefe
| 15787 ||  || — || September 15, 1993 || La Silla || E. W. Elst || NYS || align=right | 2.3 km || 
|-id=788 bgcolor=#C2E0FF
| 15788 || 1993 SB || — || September 16, 1993 || La Palma || I. P. Williams, A. Fitzsimmons, D. O'Ceallaigh || plutino || align=right | 114 km || 
|-id=789 bgcolor=#C2E0FF
| 15789 || 1993 SC || — || September 17, 1993 || La Palma || I. P. Williams, A. Fitzsimmons, D. O'Ceallaigh || plutinocritical || align=right | 328 km || 
|-id=790 bgcolor=#FA8072
| 15790 Keizan || 1993 TC ||  || October 8, 1993 || Kagoshima || M. Mukai, M. Takeishi || — || align=right | 5.6 km || 
|-id=791 bgcolor=#fefefe
| 15791 Yoshiewatanabe ||  ||  || October 15, 1993 || Kitami || K. Endate, K. Watanabe || NYS || align=right | 3.3 km || 
|-id=792 bgcolor=#E9E9E9
| 15792 ||  || — || October 9, 1993 || La Silla || E. W. Elst || — || align=right | 4.8 km || 
|-id=793 bgcolor=#fefefe
| 15793 ||  || — || October 9, 1993 || La Silla || E. W. Elst || — || align=right | 3.5 km || 
|-id=794 bgcolor=#fefefe
| 15794 ||  || — || October 9, 1993 || La Silla || E. W. Elst || NYS || align=right | 6.9 km || 
|-id=795 bgcolor=#E9E9E9
| 15795 ||  || — || October 9, 1993 || La Silla || E. W. Elst || — || align=right | 7.5 km || 
|-id=796 bgcolor=#fefefe
| 15796 ||  || — || October 9, 1993 || La Silla || E. W. Elst || V || align=right | 4.3 km || 
|-id=797 bgcolor=#fefefe
| 15797 ||  || — || October 22, 1993 || Nyukasa || M. Hirasawa, S. Suzuki || V || align=right | 4.1 km || 
|-id=798 bgcolor=#fefefe
| 15798 ||  || — || November 14, 1993 || Nyukasa || M. Hirasawa, S. Suzuki || MAS || align=right | 3.6 km || 
|-id=799 bgcolor=#E9E9E9
| 15799 || 1993 XN || — || December 8, 1993 || Oizumi || T. Kobayashi || EUN || align=right | 8.1 km || 
|-id=800 bgcolor=#E9E9E9
| 15800 || 1993 XP || — || December 8, 1993 || Oizumi || T. Kobayashi || EUN || align=right | 5.9 km || 
|}

15801–15900 

|-bgcolor=#fefefe
| 15801 || 1994 AF || — || January 2, 1994 || Oizumi || T. Kobayashi || — || align=right | 3.1 km || 
|-id=802 bgcolor=#E9E9E9
| 15802 ||  || — || January 14, 1994 || Oizumi || T. Kobayashi || — || align=right | 3.9 km || 
|-id=803 bgcolor=#E9E9E9
| 15803 Parisi || 1994 CW ||  || February 7, 1994 || Farra d'Isonzo || Farra d'Isonzo || EUN || align=right | 6.1 km || 
|-id=804 bgcolor=#E9E9E9
| 15804 Yenisei ||  ||  || March 9, 1994 || Caussols || E. W. Elst || PAD || align=right | 10 km || 
|-id=805 bgcolor=#fefefe
| 15805 Murakamitakehiko ||  ||  || April 8, 1994 || Kitami || K. Endate, K. Watanabe || — || align=right | 5.0 km || 
|-id=806 bgcolor=#d6d6d6
| 15806 Kohei ||  ||  || April 15, 1994 || Kitami || K. Endate, K. Watanabe || slow || align=right | 9.7 km || 
|-id=807 bgcolor=#C2E0FF
| 15807 ||  || — || April 15, 1994 || Mauna Kea || D. C. Jewitt, J. Chen || cubewano (cold)critical || align=right | 152 km || 
|-id=808 bgcolor=#d6d6d6
| 15808 Zelter ||  ||  || April 3, 1994 || Tautenburg Observatory || F. Börngen || — || align=right | 5.5 km || 
|-id=809 bgcolor=#C2E0FF
| 15809 || 1994 JS || — || May 11, 1994 || Cerro Tololo || D. C. Jewitt, J. X. Luu || res3:5critical || align=right | 122 km || 
|-id=810 bgcolor=#C2E0FF
| 15810 Arawn ||  ||  || May 12, 1994 || La Palma || M. J. Irwin, A. Żytkow || plutino || align=right | 128 km || 
|-id=811 bgcolor=#d6d6d6
| 15811 Nüsslein-Volhard ||  ||  || July 10, 1994 || Tautenburg Observatory || F. Börngen || — || align=right | 16 km || 
|-id=812 bgcolor=#fefefe
| 15812 || 1994 PZ || — || August 14, 1994 || Oizumi || T. Kobayashi || — || align=right | 2.8 km || 
|-id=813 bgcolor=#fefefe
| 15813 ||  || — || August 10, 1994 || La Silla || E. W. Elst || NYS || align=right | 2.7 km || 
|-id=814 bgcolor=#E9E9E9
| 15814 ||  || — || August 10, 1994 || La Silla || E. W. Elst || — || align=right | 2.2 km || 
|-id=815 bgcolor=#fefefe
| 15815 ||  || — || August 12, 1994 || La Silla || E. W. Elst || — || align=right | 4.8 km || 
|-id=816 bgcolor=#fefefe
| 15816 ||  || — || August 10, 1994 || La Silla || E. W. Elst || NYS || align=right | 2.6 km || 
|-id=817 bgcolor=#FFC2E0
| 15817 Lucianotesi || 1994 QC ||  || August 28, 1994 || San Marcello || A. Boattini, M. Tombelli || AMO || align=right data-sort-value="0.74" | 740 m || 
|-id=818 bgcolor=#fefefe
| 15818 DeVeny ||  ||  || September 12, 1994 || Kitt Peak || Spacewatch || — || align=right | 2.9 km || 
|-id=819 bgcolor=#fefefe
| 15819 Alisterling ||  ||  || September 28, 1994 || Kitt Peak || Spacewatch || — || align=right | 3.1 km || 
|-id=820 bgcolor=#C2E0FF
| 15820 || 1994 TB || — || October 2, 1994 || Mauna Kea || D. C. Jewitt, J. Chen || plutino || align=right | 135 km || 
|-id=821 bgcolor=#fefefe
| 15821 Iijimatatsushi ||  ||  || October 2, 1994 || Kitami || K. Endate, K. Watanabe || — || align=right | 3.7 km || 
|-id=822 bgcolor=#fefefe
| 15822 Genefahnestock ||  ||  || October 8, 1994 || Palomar || E. F. Helin || Hmoon || align=right | 1.7 km || 
|-id=823 bgcolor=#fefefe
| 15823 ||  || — || October 25, 1994 || Kushiro || S. Ueda, H. Kaneda || — || align=right | 1.9 km || 
|-id=824 bgcolor=#fefefe
| 15824 ||  || — || November 27, 1994 || Oizumi || T. Kobayashi || CIM || align=right | 7.1 km || 
|-id=825 bgcolor=#E9E9E9
| 15825 Capecchi ||  ||  || November 30, 1994 || Farra d'Isonzo || Farra d'Isonzo || — || align=right | 3.1 km || 
|-id=826 bgcolor=#fefefe
| 15826 || 1994 YO || — || December 28, 1994 || Oizumi || T. Kobayashi || FLO || align=right | 2.1 km || 
|-id=827 bgcolor=#E9E9E9
| 15827 ||  || — || January 10, 1995 || Oizumi || T. Kobayashi || — || align=right | 6.1 km || 
|-id=828 bgcolor=#fefefe
| 15828 Sincheskul || 1995 BS ||  || January 23, 1995 || Oizumi || T. Kobayashi || V || align=right | 2.6 km || 
|-id=829 bgcolor=#E9E9E9
| 15829 ||  || — || January 25, 1995 || Oizumi || T. Kobayashi || EUN || align=right | 4.6 km || 
|-id=830 bgcolor=#E9E9E9
| 15830 ||  || — || January 27, 1995 || Oizumi || T. Kobayashi || — || align=right | 2.9 km || 
|-id=831 bgcolor=#d6d6d6
| 15831 ||  || — || January 29, 1995 || Nachi-Katsuura || Y. Shimizu, T. Urata || — || align=right | 9.0 km || 
|-id=832 bgcolor=#fefefe
| 15832 ||  || — || February 7, 1995 || Chiyoda || T. Kojima || V || align=right | 2.9 km || 
|-id=833 bgcolor=#E9E9E9
| 15833 ||  || — || February 3, 1995 || Nyukasa || M. Hirasawa, S. Suzuki || — || align=right | 9.0 km || 
|-id=834 bgcolor=#E9E9E9
| 15834 McBride ||  ||  || February 4, 1995 || Siding Spring || D. J. Asher || PAL || align=right | 8.0 km || 
|-id=835 bgcolor=#E9E9E9
| 15835 || 1995 DY || — || February 21, 1995 || Oizumi || T. Kobayashi || — || align=right | 3.7 km || 
|-id=836 bgcolor=#C2E0FF
| 15836 ||  || — || February 24, 1995 || Mauna Kea || J. X. Luu, D. C. Jewitt || res3:4 || align=right | 128 km || 
|-id=837 bgcolor=#d6d6d6
| 15837 Mariovalori ||  ||  || February 25, 1995 || Cima Ekar || M. Tombelli || THM || align=right | 7.3 km || 
|-id=838 bgcolor=#d6d6d6
| 15838 Auclair ||  ||  || March 27, 1995 || Kitt Peak || Spacewatch || — || align=right | 8.5 km || 
|-id=839 bgcolor=#d6d6d6
| 15839 ||  || — || May 5, 1995 || Caussols || E. W. Elst || THM || align=right | 8.8 km || 
|-id=840 bgcolor=#E9E9E9
| 15840 Hiroshiendou ||  ||  || May 31, 1995 || Nanyo || T. Okuni || GEF || align=right | 5.9 km || 
|-id=841 bgcolor=#d6d6d6
| 15841 Yamaguchi || 1995 OX ||  || July 27, 1995 || Kuma Kogen || A. Nakamura || — || align=right | 7.6 km || 
|-id=842 bgcolor=#fefefe
| 15842 ||  || — || September 20, 1995 || Kushiro || S. Ueda, H. Kaneda || NYS || align=right | 8.2 km || 
|-id=843 bgcolor=#d6d6d6
| 15843 Comcom ||  ||  || September 20, 1995 || Kitami || K. Endate, K. Watanabe || — || align=right | 5.7 km || 
|-id=844 bgcolor=#d6d6d6
| 15844 ||  || — || October 20, 1995 || Nachi-Katsuura || Y. Shimizu, T. Urata || — || align=right | 13 km || 
|-id=845 bgcolor=#fefefe
| 15845 Bambi ||  ||  || October 17, 1995 || Kitt Peak || Spacewatch || V || align=right | 2.7 km || 
|-id=846 bgcolor=#fefefe
| 15846 Billfyfe ||  ||  || October 20, 1995 || Kitt Peak || Spacewatch || — || align=right | 3.0 km || 
|-id=847 bgcolor=#fefefe
| 15847 ||  || — || November 18, 1995 || Oizumi || T. Kobayashi || — || align=right | 2.6 km || 
|-id=848 bgcolor=#d6d6d6
| 15848 ||  || — || December 28, 1995 || Siding Spring || R. H. McNaught || EUP || align=right | 18 km || 
|-id=849 bgcolor=#d6d6d6
| 15849 Billharper ||  ||  || December 18, 1995 || Kitt Peak || Spacewatch || KOR || align=right | 4.7 km || 
|-id=850 bgcolor=#d6d6d6
| 15850 ||  || — || January 12, 1996 || Oizumi || T. Kobayashi || URS || align=right | 11 km || 
|-id=851 bgcolor=#E9E9E9
| 15851 Chrisfleming ||  ||  || January 13, 1996 || Kitt Peak || Spacewatch || EUN || align=right | 6.6 km || 
|-id=852 bgcolor=#fefefe
| 15852 ||  || — || January 23, 1996 || Oizumi || T. Kobayashi || FLO || align=right | 3.5 km || 
|-id=853 bgcolor=#fefefe
| 15853 Benedettafoglia ||  ||  || January 16, 1996 || Cima Ekar || U. Munari, M. Tombelli || FLO || align=right | 3.9 km || 
|-id=854 bgcolor=#fefefe
| 15854 Numa ||  ||  || February 15, 1996 || Colleverde || V. S. Casulli || — || align=right | 2.6 km || 
|-id=855 bgcolor=#fefefe
| 15855 Mariasalvatore ||  ||  || February 14, 1996 || Cima Ekar || M. Tombelli, U. Munari || — || align=right | 2.7 km || 
|-id=856 bgcolor=#fefefe
| 15856 Yanokoji || 1996 EL ||  || March 10, 1996 || Kitami || K. Endate, K. Watanabe || — || align=right | 6.1 km || 
|-id=857 bgcolor=#fefefe
| 15857 Touji ||  ||  || March 10, 1996 || Kitami || K. Endate, K. Watanabe || — || align=right | 3.3 km || 
|-id=858 bgcolor=#fefefe
| 15858 Davidwoods ||  ||  || March 12, 1996 || Kitt Peak || Spacewatch || — || align=right | 1.7 km || 
|-id=859 bgcolor=#fefefe
| 15859 ||  || — || April 15, 1996 || La Silla || E. W. Elst || — || align=right | 2.8 km || 
|-id=860 bgcolor=#fefefe
| 15860 Siráň || 1996 HO ||  || April 20, 1996 || Modra || A. Galád, D. Kalmančok || V || align=right | 2.4 km || 
|-id=861 bgcolor=#d6d6d6
| 15861 Ispahan ||  ||  || April 17, 1996 || La Silla || E. W. Elst || slow || align=right | 8.8 km || 
|-id=862 bgcolor=#E9E9E9
| 15862 ||  || — || April 17, 1996 || La Silla || E. W. Elst || — || align=right | 3.5 km || 
|-id=863 bgcolor=#d6d6d6
| 15863 ||  || — || April 18, 1996 || La Silla || E. W. Elst || KOR || align=right | 5.2 km || 
|-id=864 bgcolor=#fefefe
| 15864 ||  || — || April 20, 1996 || La Silla || E. W. Elst || — || align=right | 2.6 km || 
|-id=865 bgcolor=#fefefe
| 15865 ||  || — || April 20, 1996 || La Silla || E. W. Elst || FLO || align=right | 4.0 km || 
|-id=866 bgcolor=#fefefe
| 15866 || 1996 KG || — || May 16, 1996 || Višnjan Observatory || Višnjan Obs. || — || align=right | 3.8 km || 
|-id=867 bgcolor=#d6d6d6
| 15867 ||  || — || July 14, 1996 || La Silla || E. W. Elst || THM || align=right | 9.2 km || 
|-id=868 bgcolor=#fefefe
| 15868 Akiyoshidai || 1996 OL ||  || July 16, 1996 || Kuma Kogen || A. Nakamura || FLO || align=right | 5.6 km || 
|-id=869 bgcolor=#E9E9E9
| 15869 Tullius || 1996 PL ||  || August 8, 1996 || Colleverde || V. S. Casulli || EUN || align=right | 2.9 km || 
|-id=870 bgcolor=#E9E9E9
| 15870 Obůrka || 1996 QD ||  || August 16, 1996 || Ondřejov || P. Pravec || — || align=right | 5.0 km || 
|-id=871 bgcolor=#E9E9E9
| 15871 ||  || — || August 24, 1996 || Kushiro || S. Ueda, H. Kaneda || — || align=right | 7.2 km || 
|-id=872 bgcolor=#E9E9E9
| 15872 ||  || — || September 11, 1996 || Haleakala || NEAT || — || align=right | 6.3 km || 
|-id=873 bgcolor=#E9E9E9
| 15873 ||  || — || October 5, 1996 || Nachi-Katsuura || Y. Shimizu, T. Urata || HEN || align=right | 4.4 km || 
|-id=874 bgcolor=#C2E0FF
| 15874 ||  || — || October 9, 1996 || Mauna Kea || C. Trujillo, D. C. Jewitt, J. X. Luu, J. Chen || SDO || align=right | 358 km || 
|-id=875 bgcolor=#C2E0FF
| 15875 ||  || — || October 11, 1996 || Mauna Kea || J. X. Luu, D. C. Jewitt, C. Trujillo || plutino || align=right | 150 km || 
|-id=876 bgcolor=#d6d6d6
| 15876 ||  || — || November 12, 1996 || Kushiro || S. Ueda, H. Kaneda || KOR || align=right | 4.7 km || 
|-id=877 bgcolor=#d6d6d6
| 15877 ||  || — || November 24, 1996 || Xinglong || SCAP || — || align=right | 11 km || 
|-id=878 bgcolor=#d6d6d6
| 15878 ||  || — || December 3, 1996 || Oizumi || T. Kobayashi || — || align=right | 15 km || 
|-id=879 bgcolor=#d6d6d6
| 15879 ||  || — || December 3, 1996 || Nachi-Katsuura || Y. Shimizu, T. Urata || KOR || align=right | 4.3 km || 
|-id=880 bgcolor=#fefefe
| 15880 ||  || — || January 9, 1997 || Oizumi || T. Kobayashi || FLO || align=right | 4.2 km || 
|-id=881 bgcolor=#fefefe
| 15881 || 1997 CU || — || February 1, 1997 || Oizumi || T. Kobayashi || V || align=right | 2.5 km || 
|-id=882 bgcolor=#fefefe
| 15882 ||  || — || February 7, 1997 || Xinglong || SCAP || — || align=right | 3.8 km || 
|-id=883 bgcolor=#C2E0FF
| 15883 ||  || — || February 3, 1997 || Mauna Kea || C. Trujillo, J. Chen, D. C. Jewitt || other TNOcritical || align=right | 168 km || 
|-id=884 bgcolor=#fefefe
| 15884 Maspalomas || 1997 DJ ||  || February 27, 1997 || Chichibu || N. Satō || V || align=right | 2.9 km || 
|-id=885 bgcolor=#fefefe
| 15885 || 1997 EE || — || March 1, 1997 || Oizumi || T. Kobayashi || FLO || align=right | 2.2 km || 
|-id=886 bgcolor=#fefefe
| 15886 ||  || — || March 7, 1997 || Oizumi || T. Kobayashi || NYS || align=right | 2.3 km || 
|-id=887 bgcolor=#d6d6d6
| 15887 Daveclark ||  ||  || March 4, 1997 || Kitt Peak || Spacewatch || — || align=right | 7.7 km || 
|-id=888 bgcolor=#fefefe
| 15888 ||  || — || March 13, 1997 || Višnjan Observatory || Višnjan Obs. || MAS || align=right | 2.5 km || 
|-id=889 bgcolor=#fefefe
| 15889 Xiaoyuhe ||  ||  || March 31, 1997 || Socorro || LINEAR || — || align=right | 1.9 km || 
|-id=890 bgcolor=#fefefe
| 15890 Prachatice || 1997 GY ||  || April 3, 1997 || Kleť || M. Tichý, Z. Moravec || — || align=right | 1.7 km || 
|-id=891 bgcolor=#fefefe
| 15891 Alissazhang ||  ||  || April 2, 1997 || Socorro || LINEAR || — || align=right | 2.9 km || 
|-id=892 bgcolor=#fefefe
| 15892 ||  || — || April 3, 1997 || Socorro || LINEAR || — || align=right | 2.6 km || 
|-id=893 bgcolor=#E9E9E9
| 15893 ||  || — || April 6, 1997 || Socorro || LINEAR || — || align=right | 3.1 km || 
|-id=894 bgcolor=#fefefe
| 15894 ||  || — || May 3, 1997 || La Silla || E. W. Elst || — || align=right | 2.5 km || 
|-id=895 bgcolor=#fefefe
| 15895 ||  || — || May 3, 1997 || La Silla || E. W. Elst || V || align=right | 2.8 km || 
|-id=896 bgcolor=#fefefe
| 15896 Birkhoff ||  ||  || June 13, 1997 || Prescott || P. G. Comba || MAS || align=right | 2.1 km || 
|-id=897 bgcolor=#fefefe
| 15897 Beňačková ||  ||  || August 10, 1997 || Ondřejov || P. Pravec || — || align=right | 2.3 km || 
|-id=898 bgcolor=#E9E9E9
| 15898 Kharasterteam || 1997 QP ||  || August 26, 1997 || Ondřejov || P. Pravec, L. Kotková || — || align=right | 6.1 km || 
|-id=899 bgcolor=#fefefe
| 15899 Silvain ||  ||  || September 3, 1997 || Bédoin || P. Antonini || — || align=right | 2.5 km || 
|-id=900 bgcolor=#fefefe
| 15900 ||  || — || September 3, 1997 || Xinglong || SCAP || V || align=right | 3.2 km || 
|}

15901–16000 

|-bgcolor=#d6d6d6
| 15901 ||  || — || September 12, 1997 || Xinglong || SCAP || — || align=right | 7.0 km || 
|-id=902 bgcolor=#fefefe
| 15902 Dostál ||  ||  || September 13, 1997 || Ondřejov || L. Kotková || — || align=right | 2.9 km || 
|-id=903 bgcolor=#E9E9E9
| 15903 Rolandflorrie ||  ||  || September 5, 1997 || Burlington || T. Handley || — || align=right | 4.2 km || 
|-id=904 bgcolor=#fefefe
| 15904 Halstead ||  ||  || September 29, 1997 || Zeno || T. Stafford || — || align=right | 3.8 km || 
|-id=905 bgcolor=#E9E9E9
| 15905 Berthier ||  ||  || September 27, 1997 || Caussols || ODAS || — || align=right | 4.0 km || 
|-id=906 bgcolor=#fefefe
| 15906 Yoshikaneda ||  ||  || September 30, 1997 || Nanyo || T. Okuni || — || align=right | 2.5 km || 
|-id=907 bgcolor=#fefefe
| 15907 Robot ||  ||  || October 6, 1997 || Ondřejov || P. Pravec || — || align=right | 2.1 km || 
|-id=908 bgcolor=#d6d6d6
| 15908 Bertoni ||  ||  || October 2, 1997 || Kitt Peak || Spacewatch || — || align=right | 7.9 km || 
|-id=909 bgcolor=#fefefe
| 15909 ||  || — || October 8, 1997 || Oizumi || T. Kobayashi || — || align=right | 4.3 km || 
|-id=910 bgcolor=#fefefe
| 15910 Shinkamigoto ||  ||  || October 6, 1997 || Kitami || K. Endate, K. Watanabe || — || align=right | 3.8 km || 
|-id=911 bgcolor=#fefefe
| 15911 Davidgauthier ||  ||  || October 4, 1997 || Kitt Peak || Spacewatch || NYS || align=right | 1.2 km || 
|-id=912 bgcolor=#fefefe
| 15912 ||  || — || October 13, 1997 || Xinglong || SCAP || NYS || align=right | 7.0 km || 
|-id=913 bgcolor=#C2FFFF
| 15913 Telemachus ||  ||  || October 1, 1997 || La Silla || UDTS || L4 || align=right | 17 km || 
|-id=914 bgcolor=#fefefe
| 15914 ||  || — || October 26, 1997 || Oizumi || T. Kobayashi || NYS || align=right | 4.6 km || 
|-id=915 bgcolor=#E9E9E9
| 15915 ||  || — || October 26, 1997 || Oizumi || T. Kobayashi || — || align=right | 4.1 km || 
|-id=916 bgcolor=#fefefe
| 15916 Shigeoyamada ||  ||  || October 25, 1997 || Chichibu || N. Satō || — || align=right | 4.5 km || 
|-id=917 bgcolor=#E9E9E9
| 15917 Rosahavel ||  ||  || October 28, 1997 || Ondřejov || L. Kotková || DOR || align=right | 11 km || 
|-id=918 bgcolor=#fefefe
| 15918 Thereluzia ||  ||  || October 27, 1997 || Bornheim || N. Ehring || — || align=right | 2.8 km || 
|-id=919 bgcolor=#fefefe
| 15919 ||  || — || October 25, 1997 || Nyukasa || M. Hirasawa, S. Suzuki || FLO || align=right | 2.7 km || 
|-id=920 bgcolor=#fefefe
| 15920 ||  || — || October 29, 1997 || Socorro || LINEAR || FLO || align=right | 3.4 km || 
|-id=921 bgcolor=#fefefe
| 15921 Kintaikyo || 1997 VP ||  || November 1, 1997 || Kuma Kogen || A. Nakamura || V || align=right | 1.7 km || 
|-id=922 bgcolor=#fefefe
| 15922 Masajisaito || 1997 VR ||  || November 1, 1997 || Kitami || K. Endate, K. Watanabe || NYS || align=right | 3.3 km || 
|-id=923 bgcolor=#E9E9E9
| 15923 ||  || — || November 6, 1997 || Oizumi || T. Kobayashi || — || align=right | 14 km || 
|-id=924 bgcolor=#fefefe
| 15924 Axelmartin ||  ||  || November 7, 1997 || Solingen || B. Koch || NYS || align=right | 2.5 km || 
|-id=925 bgcolor=#E9E9E9
| 15925 Rokycany ||  ||  || November 10, 1997 || Ondřejov || L. Kotková || EUN || align=right | 6.4 km || 
|-id=926 bgcolor=#E9E9E9
| 15926 ||  || — || November 5, 1997 || Nachi-Katsuura || Y. Shimizu, T. Urata || — || align=right | 3.8 km || 
|-id=927 bgcolor=#fefefe
| 15927 ||  || — || November 23, 1997 || Oizumi || T. Kobayashi || — || align=right | 5.0 km || 
|-id=928 bgcolor=#fefefe
| 15928 ||  || — || November 23, 1997 || Oizumi || T. Kobayashi || — || align=right | 4.3 km || 
|-id=929 bgcolor=#d6d6d6
| 15929 Ericlinton ||  ||  || November 22, 1997 || Kitt Peak || Spacewatch || THM || align=right | 11 km || 
|-id=930 bgcolor=#fefefe
| 15930 ||  || — || November 29, 1997 || Socorro || LINEAR || — || align=right | 2.8 km || 
|-id=931 bgcolor=#d6d6d6
| 15931 ||  || — || November 29, 1997 || Socorro || LINEAR || THM || align=right | 10 km || 
|-id=932 bgcolor=#E9E9E9
| 15932 ||  || — || December 2, 1997 || Nachi-Katsuura || Y. Shimizu, T. Urata || — || align=right | 7.4 km || 
|-id=933 bgcolor=#fefefe
| 15933 || 1997 YD || — || December 18, 1997 || Oizumi || T. Kobayashi || EUT || align=right | 2.9 km || 
|-id=934 bgcolor=#fefefe
| 15934 || 1997 YQ || — || December 20, 1997 || Oizumi || T. Kobayashi || NYS || align=right | 2.6 km || 
|-id=935 bgcolor=#E9E9E9
| 15935 || 1997 YT || — || December 20, 1997 || Oizumi || T. Kobayashi || — || align=right | 5.6 km || 
|-id=936 bgcolor=#E9E9E9
| 15936 ||  || — || December 22, 1997 || Woomera || F. B. Zoltowski || — || align=right | 4.8 km || 
|-id=937 bgcolor=#fefefe
| 15937 ||  || — || December 25, 1997 || Oizumi || T. Kobayashi || NYS || align=right | 3.0 km || 
|-id=938 bgcolor=#fefefe
| 15938 Bohnenblust ||  ||  || December 27, 1997 || Prescott || P. G. Comba || — || align=right | 4.8 km || 
|-id=939 bgcolor=#d6d6d6
| 15939 Fessenden ||  ||  || December 28, 1997 || Kitt Peak || Spacewatch || — || align=right | 12 km || 
|-id=940 bgcolor=#d6d6d6
| 15940 ||  || — || December 31, 1997 || Oizumi || T. Kobayashi || KOR || align=right | 5.9 km || 
|-id=941 bgcolor=#d6d6d6
| 15941 Stevegauthier ||  ||  || December 29, 1997 || Kitt Peak || Spacewatch || — || align=right | 15 km || 
|-id=942 bgcolor=#fefefe
| 15942 ||  || — || December 23, 1997 || Kushiro || S. Ueda, H. Kaneda || — || align=right | 2.8 km || 
|-id=943 bgcolor=#d6d6d6
| 15943 || 1998 AZ || — || January 5, 1998 || Oizumi || T. Kobayashi || — || align=right | 8.3 km || 
|-id=944 bgcolor=#d6d6d6
| 15944 ||  || — || January 8, 1998 || Caussols || ODAS || THM || align=right | 9.8 km || 
|-id=945 bgcolor=#d6d6d6
| 15945 Raymondavid ||  ||  || January 8, 1998 || Caussols || ODAS || HYG || align=right | 10 km || 
|-id=946 bgcolor=#E9E9E9
| 15946 Satinský ||  ||  || January 8, 1998 || Modra || A. Galád, A. Pravda || — || align=right | 4.5 km || 
|-id=947 bgcolor=#E9E9E9
| 15947 Milligan ||  ||  || January 2, 1998 || Reedy Creek || J. Broughton || — || align=right | 4.5 km || 
|-id=948 bgcolor=#E9E9E9
| 15948 || 1998 BE || — || January 16, 1998 || Oizumi || T. Kobayashi || — || align=right | 12 km || 
|-id=949 bgcolor=#fefefe
| 15949 Rhaeticus || 1998 BQ ||  || January 17, 1998 || Davidschlag || E. Meyer, E. Obermair || — || align=right | 3.6 km || 
|-id=950 bgcolor=#E9E9E9
| 15950 Dallago ||  ||  || January 17, 1998 || Dossobuono || Madonna di Dossobuono Obs. || — || align=right | 3.3 km || 
|-id=951 bgcolor=#d6d6d6
| 15951 ||  || — || January 17, 1998 || Dossobuono || L. Lai || — || align=right | 16 km || 
|-id=952 bgcolor=#d6d6d6
| 15952 ||  || — || January 24, 1998 || Haleakala || NEAT || — || align=right | 12 km || 
|-id=953 bgcolor=#E9E9E9
| 15953 ||  || — || January 25, 1998 || Oizumi || T. Kobayashi || EUN || align=right | 6.7 km || 
|-id=954 bgcolor=#E9E9E9
| 15954 ||  || — || January 23, 1998 || Socorro || LINEAR || PAD || align=right | 12 km || 
|-id=955 bgcolor=#E9E9E9
| 15955 Johannesgmunden ||  ||  || January 26, 1998 || Davidschlag || E. Meyer || AGN || align=right | 5.9 km || 
|-id=956 bgcolor=#d6d6d6
| 15956 ||  || — || January 28, 1998 || Oizumi || T. Kobayashi || KOR || align=right | 4.7 km || 
|-id=957 bgcolor=#d6d6d6
| 15957 Gemoore ||  ||  || January 22, 1998 || Kitt Peak || Spacewatch || KOR || align=right | 5.3 km || 
|-id=958 bgcolor=#E9E9E9
| 15958 ||  || — || January 30, 1998 || Caussols || ODAS || — || align=right | 9.2 km || 
|-id=959 bgcolor=#E9E9E9
| 15959 ||  || — || January 24, 1998 || Haleakala || NEAT || — || align=right | 5.8 km || 
|-id=960 bgcolor=#E9E9E9
| 15960 Hluboká || 1998 CH ||  || February 2, 1998 || Kleť || M. Tichý, Z. Moravec || HNS || align=right | 7.9 km || 
|-id=961 bgcolor=#E9E9E9
| 15961 ||  || — || February 4, 1998 || Xinglong || SCAP || GEF || align=right | 6.1 km || 
|-id=962 bgcolor=#fefefe
| 15962 ||  || — || February 15, 1998 || Xinglong || SCAP || NYS || align=right | 7.4 km || 
|-id=963 bgcolor=#E9E9E9
| 15963 Koeberl ||  ||  || February 6, 1998 || La Silla || E. W. Elst || EUN || align=right | 8.6 km || 
|-id=964 bgcolor=#fefefe
| 15964 Billgray || 1998 DU ||  || February 19, 1998 || Oaxaca || J. M. Roe || H || align=right | 2.1 km || 
|-id=965 bgcolor=#d6d6d6
| 15965 Robertcox ||  ||  || February 23, 1998 || Oaxaca || J. M. Roe || EOS || align=right | 10 km || 
|-id=966 bgcolor=#d6d6d6
| 15966 ||  || — || February 25, 1998 || Haleakala || NEAT || HYG || align=right | 14 km || 
|-id=967 bgcolor=#E9E9E9
| 15967 Clairearmstrong ||  ||  || February 24, 1998 || Rolvenden || M. Armstrong || MIT || align=right | 14 km || 
|-id=968 bgcolor=#d6d6d6
| 15968 Waltercugno ||  ||  || February 27, 1998 || Cima Ekar || M. Tombelli, C. Casacci || THM || align=right | 10 km || 
|-id=969 bgcolor=#d6d6d6
| 15969 Charlesgreen ||  ||  || March 1, 1998 || La Silla || E. W. Elst || — || align=right | 17 km || 
|-id=970 bgcolor=#fefefe
| 15970 Robertbrownlee ||  ||  || March 22, 1998 || Kitt Peak || Spacewatch || — || align=right | 2.2 km || 
|-id=971 bgcolor=#fefefe
| 15971 Hestroffer ||  ||  || March 25, 1998 || Caussols || ODAS || FLO || align=right | 3.2 km || 
|-id=972 bgcolor=#d6d6d6
| 15972 ||  || — || March 20, 1998 || Socorro || LINEAR || — || align=right | 12 km || 
|-id=973 bgcolor=#d6d6d6
| 15973 ||  || — || March 24, 1998 || Socorro || LINEAR || — || align=right | 11 km || 
|-id=974 bgcolor=#d6d6d6
| 15974 ||  || — || March 31, 1998 || Socorro || LINEAR || EMA || align=right | 16 km || 
|-id=975 bgcolor=#d6d6d6
| 15975 ||  || — || March 31, 1998 || Socorro || LINEAR || — || align=right | 10 km || 
|-id=976 bgcolor=#d6d6d6
| 15976 ||  || — || March 20, 1998 || Socorro || LINEAR || EOS || align=right | 7.6 km || 
|-id=977 bgcolor=#C2FFFF
| 15977 ||  || — || June 19, 1998 || Socorro || LINEAR || L5slow? || align=right | 44 km || 
|-id=978 bgcolor=#E9E9E9
| 15978 ||  || — || August 17, 1998 || Višnjan Observatory || Višnjan Obs. || — || align=right | 3.8 km || 
|-id=979 bgcolor=#E9E9E9
| 15979 ||  || — || August 17, 1998 || Socorro || LINEAR || — || align=right | 11 km || 
|-id=980 bgcolor=#d6d6d6
| 15980 ||  || — || September 14, 1998 || Socorro || LINEAR || — || align=right | 7.3 km || 
|-id=981 bgcolor=#E9E9E9
| 15981 ||  || — || October 18, 1998 || Nachi-Katsuura || Y. Shimizu, T. Urata || GER || align=right | 7.5 km || 
|-id=982 bgcolor=#fefefe
| 15982 ||  || — || November 11, 1998 || Caussols || ODAS || — || align=right | 3.2 km || 
|-id=983 bgcolor=#E9E9E9
| 15983 ||  || — || November 18, 1998 || Oizumi || T. Kobayashi || — || align=right | 5.0 km || 
|-id=984 bgcolor=#E9E9E9
| 15984 ||  || — || November 24, 1998 || Socorro || LINEAR || — || align=right | 5.7 km || 
|-id=985 bgcolor=#fefefe
| 15985 ||  || — || November 18, 1998 || Socorro || LINEAR || — || align=right | 6.3 km || 
|-id=986 bgcolor=#E9E9E9
| 15986 Fienga ||  ||  || December 7, 1998 || Caussols || ODAS || — || align=right | 7.3 km || 
|-id=987 bgcolor=#fefefe
| 15987 ||  || — || December 15, 1998 || Caussols || ODAS || FLO || align=right | 3.2 km || 
|-id=988 bgcolor=#fefefe
| 15988 Parini ||  ||  || December 11, 1998 || Kitt Peak || Spacewatch || — || align=right | 3.4 km || 
|-id=989 bgcolor=#fefefe
| 15989 ||  || — || December 14, 1998 || Socorro || LINEAR || FLO || align=right | 3.7 km || 
|-id=990 bgcolor=#fefefe
| 15990 ||  || — || December 17, 1998 || Višnjan Observatory || K. Korlević || NYS || align=right | 2.9 km || 
|-id=991 bgcolor=#fefefe
| 15991 ||  || — || December 17, 1998 || Oizumi || T. Kobayashi || — || align=right | 4.4 km || 
|-id=992 bgcolor=#fefefe
| 15992 Cynthia ||  ||  || December 18, 1998 || Farpoint || G. Hug || V || align=right | 3.7 km || 
|-id=993 bgcolor=#E9E9E9
| 15993 ||  || — || December 24, 1998 || Oizumi || T. Kobayashi || — || align=right | 4.8 km || 
|-id=994 bgcolor=#fefefe
| 15994 ||  || — || December 23, 1998 || Višnjan Observatory || K. Korlević || — || align=right | 3.9 km || 
|-id=995 bgcolor=#fefefe
| 15995 ||  || — || December 25, 1998 || Višnjan Observatory || K. Korlević, M. Jurić || NYS || align=right | 3.6 km || 
|-id=996 bgcolor=#fefefe
| 15996 ||  || — || December 27, 1998 || Oizumi || T. Kobayashi || — || align=right | 5.1 km || 
|-id=997 bgcolor=#E9E9E9
| 15997 || 1999 AX || — || January 7, 1999 || Oizumi || T. Kobayashi || EUN || align=right | 5.7 km || 
|-id=998 bgcolor=#fefefe
| 15998 ||  || — || January 9, 1999 || Oizumi || T. Kobayashi || — || align=right | 7.0 km || 
|-id=999 bgcolor=#fefefe
| 15999 ||  || — || January 9, 1999 || Višnjan Observatory || K. Korlević || FLO || align=right | 3.0 km || 
|-id=000 bgcolor=#fefefe
| 16000 Neilgehrels ||  ||  || January 10, 1999 || Kitt Peak || Spacewatch || NYS || align=right | 2.7 km || 
|}

References

External links 
 Discovery Circumstances: Numbered Minor Planets (15001)–(20000) (IAU Minor Planet Center)

0015